

Twelve Peers
They were probably, at the time of the old Frankish monarchy, the great princes and vassals who were called to appoint the successor of the king among the eligible princes to the crown.
At the Capetian era, we find that the number is set at twelve, but all throughout the Old Regime, there were 173 fiefs which were erected in peerage.

Six ecclesiastical peers

The archbishop-duke of Reims
47 holders:
1200-1202 Guillaume de Champagne (1135-1202)
1204-1206 Guy Paré (+1206)
1207-1218 Albéric de Humbert de Hautvilliers (+1218)
1219-1226 Guillaume de Joinville (+1226) (previously Langres)
1227-1240 Henri de Dreux (1193-1240) (previously Châlons)
1244-1249 Yves de Saint-Martin (+1249)
1249-1250 Juhel de Mathefelon (+1250)
1251-1263 Thomas de Beaumets (+1263)
1266-1270 Jean de Courtenay-Champignelles (1226-1270)
1274-1298 Pierre Barbet (+1298)
1299-1324 Robert de Courtenay-Champignelles (1251-1324)
1324-1334 Guillaume de Trie (+1334)
1334-1351 Jean de Vienne (+1351)
1351-1352 Hugues d'Arcy (+1352) (previously Laon)
1352-1355 Humbert II de La Tour du Pin (1312-1355)
1355-1373 Jean de Craon (+1373)
1373-1375 Louis Thésart (+1375)
1376-1389 Richard Picques de Besançon (+1389)
1389-1390 Ferry Cassinel (+1390)
1390-1409 Guy de Roye (+1409)
1409-1413 Simon de Cramaud (+1429)
1413 Pierre Trousseau (+1413)
1414-1444 Renaud de Chartres (+1444) (previously Beauvais)
1449-1473 Jean Jouvenel des Ursins (1388-1473) (previously Laon)
1445-1449 Jacques Jouvenel des Ursins (1410-1457)
1473-1493 Pierre de Laval de Montfort (+1493)
1493-1497 Robert Briçonnet (+1497)
1497-1507 Guillaume Briçonnet (1445-1514)
1507-1508 Charles-Dominique de Caretto (1454-1514)
1508-1532 Robert de Lénoncourt (+1532)
1533-1538 Jean de Lorraine (1498-1550)
1538-1574 Charles de Lorraine-Guise (1524-1574)
1591 Philippe de Lénoncourt (1527-1591) (previously Châlons)
1574-1588 Louis de Lorraine-Guise (1555-1588)
1592-1594 Nicolas de Pellevé (1518-1594)
1594-1605 Philippe du Bec (1520-1605)
1605-1621 Louis de Lorraine-Guise (1575-1621)
1622-1629 Gabriel de Gifford de Sainte-Marie (1554-1629)
1629-1641 Henri de Lorraine-Guise (1614-1664)
1641-1651 Léonore d'Étampes de Valençay (1589-1651)
1651-1657 Henri de Savoie-Nemours (1625-1659)
1657-1671 Antoine Barberini (1607-1671)
1671-1710 Charles-Maurice Le Tellier de Louvois (1642-1710)
1710-1721 François de Mailly-Nesle (1658-1721)
1721-1762 Armand-Jules de Rohan-Guémenée (1695-1762)
1762-1777 Charles-Antoine de La Roche-Aymon (1697-1777)
1777-1790 Alexandre-Angélique de Talleyrand-Périgord (1736-1821)

The bishop-duke of Laon
41 holders
1200-1207 Roger de Rozoy (+1207)
1207-1210 Renaud Surdelle (+1210)
1210-1215 Robert de Châtillon (+1215)
1215-1238 Anselme de Mauny de Bercenay (+1238)
1238-1249 Garnier (+1249)
1249-1261 Ithier de Mauny (+1261)
1262-1269 Guillaume des Moustiers (+1269)
1270-1279 Geoffroy de Beaumont (+1279)
1280-1285 Guillaume de Châtillon-Jaligny (+1285)
1285-1297 Robert de Torote (+1297)
1297-1307 Gazon de Savigny (+1307)
1317-1325 Raoul Rouxelet (+1325)
1326-1336 Albert de Roye (+1336)
1336-1339 Roger d'Armagnac (+1339)
1339-1351 Hugues d'Arcy (+1352)
1351-1358 Robert le Coq (+1368)
1363-1370 Geoffroy Le Meingre (+1370)
1370-1386 Pierre Aycelin de Montaigu (+1388)
1386-1418 Jean de Roucy (+1418)
1419-1444 Guillaume de Champeaux (+1444)
1444-1449 Jean Jouvenel des Ursins (1388-1473) (previously Beauvais)
1449-1460 Antoine du Bec-Crespin (+1472)
1460-1468 Jean de Gaucourt (+1468)
1468-1472 Renaud de Bourbon (+1483)
1473-1509 Charles de Luxembourg-Ligny (1447-1509)
1510-1552 Louis de Bourbon-Vendôme (1493-1556)
1552-1560 Jean Doc (+1560)
1564-1580 Jean de Bours (+1580)
1581-1598 Valentin Douglas (+1598)
1599 François de Luxembourg (+1613) (also duke-peer of Piney-Luxembourg)
1601-1612 Godefroy de Billy (1536-1612)
1612-1619 Benjamin de Brichanteau de Nangis (1585-1619)
1620-1652 Philibert de Brichanteau de Nangis (1588-1652)
1653-1681 César d'Estrées (1628-1714)
1681-1694 Jean d'Estrées (1651-1694)
1662-1721 Louis-Annet de Clermont-Chaste de Roussillon (1662-1721)
1721-1723 Charles de Saint-Albin (1698-1764)
1723 Henri François Xavier de Belsunce de Castelmoron (1670-1755)
1724-1741 Etienne-Joseph de La Fare (1690-1741)
1741-1777 Jean-François de Rochechouart de Clermont de Faudoas (1708-1777)
1777-1790 Louis-Maxime de Sabran (1739-1811)

The bishop-duke of Langres
40 holders
1200-1205 Hilduin de Vandoeuvre (+1205)
1205-1210 Robert de Châtillon (+1226)
1210-1219 Guillaume de Joinville (+1226)
1220-1231 Hugues de Montréal (+1231)
1232-1240 Robert de Torote (+1246)
1240-1250 Hugues de Rochecorbon (+1250)
1250-1266 Guy de Rochefort (+1266)
1266-1293 Guy de Genève (+1293)
1294-1305 Jean de Rochefort (+1305)
1305-1306 Bertrand de Goth (+1313)
1306-1318 Guillaume de Durfort de Duras (+1330)
1318-1324 Louis de Poitiers (+1327)
1324-1329 Pierre de Rochefort (+1329)
1329-1335 Jean de Chalon (1300-1335)
1335-1338 Guy Baudet (+1338)
1338-1342 Guy Des Prez (+1349)
1342-1344 Jean d'Arcy (+1344)
1344-1345 Hugues de Pomard (+1345)
1345-1374 Guillaume de Poitiers (+1374)
1374-1395 Bernard de La Tour d'Auvergne (+1395)
1413-1433 Charles de Poitiers (+1433) (previously Châlons)
1397-1413 Louis de Bar de Mousson (+1430)
1433-1435 Jean Gobillon (+1435)
1436-1452 Philippe de Vienne (+1452)
1452-1453 Jean d'Aussy (+1453)
1453-1481 Guy Bernard (+1481)
1481-1497 Jean d'Amboise (+1497)
1497-1512 Jean d'Amboise (+1512)
1512-1529 Michel Boudet (+1529)
1529-1561 Claude de Longwy de Givry (1484-1561)
1562-1565 Jean Helvis de La Roche (+1565)
1565-1569 Pierre de Gondi de Retz (1533-1616)
1570-1614 Charles de Pérusse d'Escars (1522-1614)
1615-1655 Sébastien Zamet (1587-1655)
1655-1670 Louis Barbier de La Rivière (1593-1670)
1671-1695 Louis-Armand de Simiane de Gordes (1627-1695)
1695-1724 François de Clermont-Tonnerre (1658-1724)
1724-1733 Pierre de Pardaillan de Gondrin d'Antin (1692-1733)
1734-1770 Gilles-Gaspard de Montmorin de Saint-Hérem (1691-1770)
1770-1790 César Guillaume de La Luzerne (1738-1821)

The bishop-count of Beauvais
39 holders
1200-1217 Philippe de Dreux (v.1158-1217)
1217-1234 Milon de Châtillon-Nanteuil (+1234)
1234-1236 Geoffroy de Clermont de Nelle (+1236)
1237-1248 Robert de Cressonsart (+1248)
1249-1267 Guillaume de Gretz (+1267)
1267-1283 Renaud de Nanteuil (de Nantolio) (+1283)
1283-1300 Thiébaud de Nanteuil (de Nantolio) (+1300)
1301-1312 Simon de Clermont de Nelle (+1312) (previously Noyon)
1312-1347 Jean de Marigny (+1351)
1347-1356 Guillaume Bertrand de Briquebecq (+1356) (previously Noyon)
1356-1360 Philippe d'Alençon (1338-1397)
1360-1368 Jean de Dormans (+1373)
1368-1375 Jean d'Augerant (+1375)
1375-1387 Miles de Dormans (+1387)
1387-1388 Guillaume de Vienne (+1407)
1388-1395 Thomas d'Estouteville (+1395)
1395-1397 Louis d'Orléans (+1397)
1398-1412 Pierre de Savoisy (+1412)
1413 Renaud de Chartres (+1444) Châtillon
1413-1419 Bernard de Chevenon (+1419)
1420-1430 Pierre Cauchon (+1442)
1432-1444 Jean Juvénal des Ursins (1388-1473)
1444-1462 Guillaume de Helande (+1462)
1462-1487 Jean de Bar (+1487)
1487-1503 Antoine Dubois (+1537)
1488-1521 Louis de Villiers de L'Isle-Adam (+1521)
1523-1530 Antoine de Lascaris de Tende (+1546)
1530-1535 Charles de Villiers de l'Isle-Adam (+1535)
1535-1569 Odet de Coligny de Châtillon (1515-1571)
1569-1575 Charles de Bourbon (1523-1590) (also duke-peer of Graville)
1575-1593 Nicolas Fumée (+1593)
1595-1616 René Potier de Blancmesnil (1574-1616)
1617-1650 Augustin Potier de Blancmesnil (+1650)
1650-1679 Nicolas Choart de Buzenval (1611-1679)
1679-1713 Toussaint de Forbin-Janson (1629-1713)
1713-1728 François-Honorat de Beauvillier de Saint-Aignan (1682-1751)
1728-1772 Etienne-René Potier de Gesvres (1697-1774)
1772-1790 François-Joseph de La Rochefoucauld-Bayers (1727-1792)

The bishop-count of Châlons
40 holders:
1200-1201 Rotrou de Perche (+1201)
1201-1215 Gérard de Douay (+1215)
1215-1226 Guillaume II de Perche (+1226)
1226-1227 Henri de Dreux (1193-1240)
1228-1237 Philippe de Merville de Nemours (+1237)
1238-1247 Geoffroy de Grandpré (+1247)
1248-1261 Pierre de Hans (+1261)
1263-1271 Conon de Vitry (+1271)
1271-1273 Arnoul de Los de Chiny (+1273)
1274-1277 Boson (+1278)
1277-1284 Rémi de Saint-Jean de Sommetourbe (+1284)
1284-1313 Jean de Châteauvillain (+1313)
1313-1328 Pierre de Latilly (+1328)
1328-1335 Simon de Châteauvillain (+1335)
1335-1338 Philippe de Melun (+1345)
1339 Jean de Mandevillain (+1339)
1340-1351 Jean Happe (+1351)
1352-1356 Regnaud de Chauveau (+1356)
1357-1389 Archambaud de Lautrec (+1389)
1390-1413 Charles de Poitiers (+1433)
1413-1420 Louis de Bar de Mousson (+1430) (previously Langres)
1420-1438 Jean de Sarrebrück (+1438)
1439 Jean Tudert (+1439)
1439-1453 Guillaume Le Tur (+1453)
1453-1503 Geoffroy Floreau de Saint-Géran (+1503)
1503-1535 Gilles de Luxembourg (+1535)
1535-1550 Robert de Lenoncourt (v.1510-1561)
1550-1556 Philippe de Lénoncourt (1527-1591)
1552-1560 Jérôme Burgensis (+1573)
1571-1573 Nicolas Clausse de Marchaumont (1545-1573)
1574-1624 Cosme Clausse de Marchaumont (1548-1624)
1624-1640 Henri Clausse de Fleury (+1640)
1640-1680 Félix Vialart de Herse (1613-1680)
1680-1695 Louis Antoine de Noailles (1651-1729)
1695-1720 Jean-Gaston de Noailles (1669-1720)
1720-1733 Nicolas-Charles de Saulx-Tavannes (1690-1759)
1733-1763 Claude-Antoine de Choiseul-Beaupré (1697-1763)
1763 Antoine de Lastic-Sieujac (1709-1763)
1764-1781 Antoine-Léon Le Clerc de Juigné (1728-1811)
1781-1790 Jules-Antoine de Clermont-Tonnerre (1748-1830)

The bishop-count of Noyon
40 holders:
1200-1221 Etienne de Villebéon de Nemours (+1221)
1222-1228 Gérard de Châtillon-Bazoches (+1228)
1228-1240 Nicolas de Roye (+1240)
1240-1249 Pierre Charlot de France (+1249)
1250-1272 Vermond de La Boissière (+1272)
1272-1297 Guy Des Près (+1297)
1297-1301 Simon de Clermont de Nelle (+1312)
1302-1303 Pierre de Ferrières (+1307)
1304-1315 André Le Moine de Crécy (+1315)
1315-1317 Florent de La Boissière (+1330)
1317-1330 Foucaud de Rochechouart (+1343)
1331-1337 Guillaume Bertrand de Briquebecq (+1356)
1337-1339 Etienne Aubert (+1362)
1339-1342 Pierre André (+1368)
1342-1347 Bernard Le Brun (+1349)
1347-1349 Guy de Comborn (+1349)
1349 Firmin Cocquerel (+1349)
1349-1351 Philippe d'Arbois (v.1301-1378)
1351-1352 Jean de Meullent (+1363)
1352-1388 Gilles de Lorris (+1388)
1388-1409 Philippe de Moulin-Engilbert (+1409)
1409-1415 Pierre de Fresnel (+1418)
1415-1425 Raoul de Coucy (+1425)
1426-1473 Jean de Mailly (+1473)
1473-1501 Guillaume de Maraffin (+1501)
1501-1525 Charles de Hangest (+1528)
1525-1577 Jean de Hangest (+1577)
1578-1587 Claude d'Angennes de Rambouillet (1538-1601)
1588-1590 Gabriel de Blaigny (+1593)
1590-1594 Jean Meunier (+1594)
1594-1595 François-Annibal d'Estrées (1573-1670)
1596-1625 Charles de Balzac (+1625)
1626-1660 Henri de Baradat (1598-1660)
1660-1701 François de Clermont-Tonnerre (1629-1701)
1701-1707 Claude-Maur d'Aubigné (1658-1719)
1707-1731 Charles-François de Châteauneuf de Rochebonne (1671-1740)
1732-1733 Claude de Rouvroy de Saint-Simon (1695-1760)
1733-1766 Jean-François de La Cropte de Bourzac (1696-1766)
1766-1777 Charles de Broglie (1734-1777)
1777-1790 Louis-André Grimaldi de Cagnes (1736-1808)

Six lay peers

The duke-peer of Burgundy
10 holders (province returned to royal domain in 1477) 
Odo III (1166–1218), duke-peer of Burgundy (1193–1218)
Hugh IV (1213–1272), duke-peer of Burgundy (1218–1272)
Robert II (v.1249-1306), duke-peer of Burgundy (1272–1306)
Hugh V (1294–1304), duke-peer of Burgundy (1306–1314)
Odo IV (1295–1349), duke-peer of Burgundy (1314–1349)
Philip I de Rouvres (1346–1361), duke-peer of Burgundy (1349–1361)
Philip II the Bold (1342–1404), duke-peer of Burgundy (1364–1404)
John the Fearless (1371–1419), duke-peer of Burgundy (1404–1419)
Philip III the Good (1396-1467), duke-peer of Burgundy (1419-1467)
Charles the Rash (1433–1477), duke-peer of Burgundy (1467–1477)

The duke-peer of Normandy
5 holders (province returned to royal domain in 1204) 
Richard Coeur de Lion (1157–1199), duke-peer of Normandy (1189–1199), king of England
John Lackland (1167–1216), duke-peer of Normandy (1199–1203), king of England
John the Good (1319–1364), duke-peer of Normandy (1331–1350) then king (John II) of France
Charles the Wise (1338–1380), duke-peer of Normandy (1355–1364), dauphin of France then king (Charles V) of France
Charles of France (1446–1472), duke-peer of Normandy (1465–1469) then of Guyenne

The duke-peer of Aquitaine (Guyenne)
9 holders (province returned to royal domain in 1453) 
Richard Coeur de Lion (1157–1199), duke-peer of Aquitaine (1180–1199), king of England
John Lackland (1167–1216), duke-peer of Aquitaine (1199–1203), king of England
Henry III (1207–1272), duke-peer of Guyenne (1259–1272), king of England
Edward I (1239–1307), duke-peer of Guyenne (1272–1294 and 1299–1307), king of England
Edward II (1284–1327), duke-peer of Guyenne (1307–1327), king of England
Edward III (1312–1377), duke-peer of Guyenne (1327–1336 and 1361–1362), king of England
Edward the Black Prince (1330–1376), duke-peer of Guyenne (1362–1370), prince of Wales
Louis of France (1397–1415), duke-peer of Guyenne (1400–1415), dauphin of France
Charles of France (1446–1472), duke-peer of Guyenne (1469–1472)

The count-peer of Flanders
15 holders (province ceded in 1526, by the Treaty of Madrid, but not ratified; finally ceded in Treaty of Cateau-Cambrésis)
Baldwin IX (1171–1206), count-peer of Flanders (1195–1206), emperor (Baldwin I) of Constantinople
Ferrand or Ferdinand of Portugal (1188–1233), count-peer of Flanders (1212–1233)
Thomas II of Savoy (v.1199-1259), count-peer of Flanders (1237–1244)
William de Dampierre (1224–1251), count-peer of Flanders (1245–1251)
Guy I de Dampierre (1225–1305), count-peer of Flanders (1251–1300)
Robert III de Dampierre (1239–1322), count-peer of Flanders (1305–1322)
Louis I de Dampierre (v.1304-1346), count-peer of Flanders (1322–1346)
Louis II de Dampierre (1330–1384), count-peer of Flanders (1346–1384)
Philip II the Bold (1342–1404), count-peer of Flanders (1384–1404), duke-peer of Burgundy
John the Fearless (1371–1419), count-peer of Flanders (1404–1419), duke-peer of Burgundy
Philip III the Good (1396–1467), count-peer of Flanders (1419–1467), duke-peer of Burgundy
Charles the Rash (1433–1477), count-peer of Flanders (1467–1477), duke-peer of Burgundy
Maximilian I of Austria (1459–1519), count-peer of Flanders (1477–1482) then German emperor
Philip the Handsome (1478–1506), count-peer of Flanders (1482–1506), king (Philip I) of Castile
Charles of Austria (1500–1558), count-peer of Flanders (1506–1526), king (Charles I of Spain) and German emperor (Charles V)

The count-peer of Champagne
8 holders (province returned to royal domain in 1314) 
Theobald III de Blois (1179–1201), count-peer of Champagne (1197–1201)
Theobald IV de Blois (1201–1253), count-peer of Champagne (1201–1253), king (Theobald I) of Navarre
Theobald V de Blois (1235–1270), count-peer of Champagne (1253–1270), king (Theobald II) of Navarre
Henry III de Blois (+1274), count-peer of Champagne (1270–1274), king (Henry I) of Navarre
Joan I de Blois (1273–1305), countess-peer of Champagne (1274–1305), queen of Navarre
Louis le Hutin (1289–1316), count-peer of Champagne (1305–1314) then king (Louis X) of France
Joan II (1311–1349), countess-peer of Champagne (1316–1318) then queen of Navarre
Charles the Bad (1332–1387), titular count-peer of Champagne (1349–1353), king (Charles II) of Navarre

The count-peer of Toulouse
4 holders (province returned to royal domain in 1229 and 1271) 
Raymond VI (1156–1222), count-peer of Toulouse (1194–1215 and 1218–1222)
Simon de Montfort (v.1158-1218), count-peer of Toulouse (1215–1218)
Raymond VII (1197–1249), count-peer of Toulouse (1222–1249)
Alphonse II of France (1220–1271), count-peer of Toulouse (1220–1271)

Later Peers
Since 1204, when the duchies of Normandy and Aquitaine were absorbed into the French crown, the roster of the Twelve Peers had never been complete. By 1297, there were only three lay peers — the duke of Burgundy, the duke of Guyenne, and the count of Flanders (the county of Champagne was held by the king's eldest son and heir). Philip IV decided to restore the number of peers to twelve by granting peerage to three princes of the royal line — the duke of Brittany, the count of Anjou, and the count of Artois.

13th century

The duke-peer of Brittany
14 holders, peerage in 1297 (duchy attached to royal domain in 1532) 
John II (1239–1305), duke-peer of Brittany (1239–1305)
Arthur II (1262–1312), duke-peer of Brittany (1305–1312)
John III (1286–1341), duke-peer of Brittany (1312–1341)
Charles de Blois (1319–1364), duke-peer of Brittany (1341–1364)
John V (1341–1399), duke-peer of Brittany (1365–1399)
John VI (1389–1442), duke-peer of Brittany (1399–1442)
Francis I (1414–1450), duke-peer of Brittany (1442–1450)
Peter II (1418–1457), duke-peer of Brittany (1450–1457)
Arthur III (1393–1458), duke-peer of Brittany (1457–1458)
Francis II (1435–1488), duke-peer of Brittany (1458–1488)
Anne (1477–1514), duchess-peeress of Brittany (1488–1514), queen of France
Claude of France (1499–1524), duchess-peeress of Brittany (1514–1524), queen of France
Francis of France (1518–1536), duke-peer of Brittany (1524–1536), dauphin of France
Henry II of France (1519–1559), duke-peer of Brittany (1536–1547), dauphin of France then king (Henry II) of France

The count-peer of Anjou
12 holders, peerage in 1297 (appanage several times returned to royal domain, elevated to duchy in 1360) 
Charles I de Valois (1270–1325), count-peer of Anjou (1297–1325)
Philip de Valois (1293–1350), count-peer of Anjou (1325–1328) then king (Philip VI) of France
John the Good (1319–1364), count-peer of Anjou (1331–1350) and duke-peer of Normandy then king (John II) of France
Louis I d'Anjou (1339–1384), count then duke of Anjou, peer (1356–1384)
Louis II d'Anjou (1377–1417), duke-peer of Anjou (1384–1417), king of Naples
Louis III d'Anjou (1403–1434), duke-peer of Anjou (1417–1434)
René I d'Anjou (1409–1480), duke-peer of Anjou (1434–1480), king of Naples
Charles d'Anjou (1436–1481), duke-peer of Anjou (1480–1481)
Louise of Savoy (1476–1531), duchess-peeress of Anjou (1515–1531)
Henry of France (1551–1589), duke-peer of Anjou (1566–1574) then king (Henry III) of France
Francis of France (1554–1584), duke-peer of Anjou (1576–1584)
Louis of France (1755–1824), duke-peer of Anjou (1771–1790) then king (Louis XVIII) of France

The count-peer of Artois
14 holders, peerage in 1297 (appanage several times returned to royal domain) 
Robert II d'Artois (1250–1302), count-peer of Artois (1297–1302)
Robert III d'Artois (1287–1342), count-peer of Artois (1302–1309) then of Beaumont-le-Roger
Mahaut d'Artois (v.1268-1329), countess-peeress of Artois (1309–1329)
Joan de Chalon (1294–1330), countess-peeress of Artois (1329–1330)
Joan of France (1308–1347), countess-peeress of Artois (1330–1347)
Philip I de Rouvre (1346–1361), count-peer of Artois (1347–1361) and duke-peer of Burgundy
Marguerite of France (v.1310-1382), countess-peeress of Artois (1361–1382)
Louis II de Dampierre (1330–1384), count-peer of Artois (1382–1384) and of Flanders
Philip II the Bold (1342–1404), count-peer of Artois (1384–1404) and duke-peer of Burgundy
John the Fearless (1371–1419), count-peer of Artois (1404–1419) and duke-peer of Burgundy
Philip III the Good (1396–1467), count-peer of Artois (1419–1467) and duke-peer of Burgundy
Charles the Rash (1433–1477), count-peer of Artois (1467–1477) and duke-peer of Burgundy
Philip the Handsome (1478–1506), count-peer of Artois (1493–1506) and of Flanders, king (Philip I) of Castile
Charles of Austria (1500–1558), count-peer of Artois (1506–1526) and of Flanders, king (Charles I) of Spain and German emperor (Charles V)

14th century

Châteauneuf-en-Thymerais
barony-peerage 1314, 8 holders 
Charles I de Valois (1270–1325), baron-peer of Châteauneuf (1314–1325)
Charles II de Valois-Alençon (v.1297-1346), baron-peer of Châteauneuf (1325–1346)
Charles III d'Alençon (1337–1375), baron-peer of Châteauneuf (1346–1361)
Peter II d'Alençon (1340–1404), baron-peer of Châteauneuf (1361–1404)
John IV d'Alençon (1385–1415), baron-peer of Châteauneuf (1404–1415)
John V d'Alençon (v.1407-1476), baron-peer of Châteauneuf (1415–1458 and 1461–1474)
René d'Alençon (v.1454-1492), baron-peer of Châteauneuf (1483–1492)
Charles IV d'Alençon (1489–1525), baron-peer of Châteauneuf (1492–1525)

Poitou
county-peerage in 1315, 5 holders 
Philip the Tall (1293–1322), count-peer of Poitiers (1315–1316) then king (Philip V) of France
Jean de Berry (1340–1416), count-peer of Poitiers (1356–1416)
John of France (1398–1417), count-peer of Poitiers (1416–1417), dauphin of France
Charles of France (1403–1461), count-peer of Poitiers (1417–1422), dauphin of France then king (Charles VII) of France
Charles of France (1757–1836), count-peer of Poitou (1778–1790) then king (Charles X) of France

La Marche
county-peerage in 1316, 12 holders 
Charles the Fair (1294–1328), count-peer of La Marche (1316–1322) then king (Charles IV) of France
Louis I de Bourbon (1270–1342), count-peer of La Marche (1327–1342)
Jacques I de Bourbon (1315–1361), count-peer of La Marche (1342–1361)
Pierre de Bourbon (1342–1361), count-peer of La Marche (1361)
Jean de Bourbon (v.1343–1393), count-peer of La Marche (1361–1393)
Jacques II de Bourbon (1370–1438), count-peer of La Marche (1393–1438)
Bernard d'Armagnac (1402–1462), count-peer of La Marche (1438–1462)
Jacques d'Armagnac (1433–1477), count-peer of La Marche (1462–1477)
Pierre II de Bourbon (1439–1503), count-peer of La Marche (1477–1503)
Suzanne de Bourbon (1491–1521), countess-peeress of La Marche (1503–1521)
Charles III de Bourbon (1490–1527), count-peer of La Marche (1505–1527)
Charles of France (1522–1545), count-peer of La Marche (1540–1545)

Évreux
county then duchy, peerage in 1316, 6 holders 
Louis I d'Evreux (1276–1319), count-peer of Evreux (1316–1319)
Philippe d'Evreux (1301–1343), count-peer of Evreux (1326–1343) and king (Philip III) of Navarre
Charles the Bad (1332–1387), count-peer of Evreux (1343–1387) and of Evreux, king (Charles II) of Navarre
Charles the Noble (1361–1425), count-peer of Evreux (1387–1404), king (Charles III) of Navarre
John Stewart of Darnley (+1428), count-peer of Evreux (1426)
Francis of France (1554–1584), duke-peer of Evreux (1569–1584) and of Anjou

Angoulême
county then duchy, peerage in 1317, 11 holders 
Philip d'Evreux (1301–1343), count-peer of Angoulême (1317–1343) and of Evreux, king (Philip III) of Navarre
Charles the Bad (1332–1387), count-peer of Angoulême (1343–1349) and of Evreux, king (Charles II) of Navarre
Jean de Berry (1340–1416), count-peer of Angoulême (1356–1373) and of Poitiers
Louis I d'Orléans (1372–1407), count-peer of Angoulême (1394–1407)
John d'Orléans-Angoulême (1404–1467), count-peer of Angoulême (1407–1467)
Charles d'Angoulême (1460–1496), count-peer of Angoulême (1467–1496)
Francis d'Angoulême (1494–1547), count-peer of Angoulême (1496–1515) then king (Francis I) of France
Louise of Savoy (1476–1531), duchess-peeress of Angoulême (1515–1531) and of Anjou
Charles of France (1522–1545), duke-peer of Angoulême (1540–1545) and count-peer of La Marche
Charles de Berry (1686–1714), duke-peer of Angoulême (1710–1714)
Charles of France (1757–1836), duke-peer of Angoulême (1773–1790) and count-peer of Poitou then king (Charles X) of France

Mortain
county-peerage in 1317, 5 holders 
Philip d'Evreux (1301–1343), count-peer of Mortain (1317–1343) and of Evreux, king (Philip III) of Navarre
Charles the Bad (1332–1387), count-peer of Mortain (1343–1349) and of Evreux, king (Charles II) of Navarre
Peter d'Evreux (1366–1412), count-peer of Mortain (1408–1412) and baron-peer of Coulommiers
Louis of France (1397–1415), count-peer of Mortain (1414–1415) and duke-peer of Guyenne, dauphin of France
Charles of France (1446–1472), count-peer of Mortain (1465–1472) and duke-peer of Normandy

Étampes
county-peerage in 1327, 2 holders 
Charles d'Evreux (v.1305-1336), count-peer of Etampes (1327–1336)
Louis II d'Evreux (1336–1400), count-peer of Etampes (1336–1400)

Bourbon
duchy-peerage in 1327, 17 holders 
Louis I de Bourbon (1270–1342), duke-peer of Bourbon (1327–1342) and count-peer of La Marche
Peter I de Bourbon (1311–1356), duke-peer of Bourbon (1342–1356)
Louis II de Bourbon (1337–1410), duke-peer of Bourbon (1356–1410)
Jean I de Bourbon (1380–1434), duke-peer of Bourbon (1410–1434)
Charles I de Bourbon (1401–1456), duke-peer of Bourbon (1434–1456)
Jean II de Bourbon (1427–1488), duke-peer of Bourbon (1456–1488)
Charles II de Bourbon (v.1434-1488), duke-peer of Bourbon (1488)
Peter II de Bourbon (1439–1503), duke-peer of Bourbon (1488–1503) and count-peer of La Marche
Suzanne de Bourbon (1491–1521), duchess-peeress of Bourbon (1503–1521) and countess-peeress of La Marche
Charles III de Bourbon (1490–1527), duke-peer of Bourbon (1505–1527) and count-peer of La Marche
Louise of Savoy (1476–1531), duchess-peeress of Bourbon (1527–1531) and of Anjou
Charles of France (1522–1545), duke-peer of Bourbon (1544–1545) and of Angoulême
Henry of France (1551–1589), duke-peer of Bourbon (1566–1574) and of Anjou then king (Henry III) of France
Louis II de Bourbon-Condé (1621–1686), duke-peer of Bourbon (1661–1685)
Louis III de Bourbon-Condé (1668–1710), duke-peer of Bourbon (1685–1710)
Louis-Henri de Bourbon-Condé (1692–1740), duke-peer of Bourbon (1710–1740)
Louis-Joseph de Bourbon-Condé (1736–1818), duke-peer of Bourbon (1740–1790)

Beaumont-le-Roger
county-peerage in 1328, 5 holders 
Robert III d'Artois (1287–1342), count-peer of Beaumont-le-Roger (1328–1331)
Philippe I d'Orléans (1336–1375), count-peer of Beaumont-le-Roger (1344–1353)
Charles the Bad (1332–1387), count-peer of Beaumont-le-Roger (1354–1387) and of Evreux, king (Charles II) of Navarre
Charles the Noble (1361–1425), count-peer of Beaumont-le-Roger (1387–1404) and of Evreux, king (Charles III) of Navarre
Francis of France (1554–1584), count-peer of Beaumont-le-Roger (1569–1584) and duke-peer of Anjou

Clermont-en-Beauvaisis
county-peerage in 1331, 11 holders 
Louis I de Bourbon (1270–1342), count-peer of Clermont (1331–1342) and duke-peer of Bourbon
Peter I de Bourbon (1311–1356), count-peer of Clermont (1342–1356) and duke-peer of Bourbon
Louis II de Bourbon (1337–1410), count-peer of Clermont (1356–1410) and duke-peer of Bourbon
Jean I de Bourbon (1380–1434), count-peer of Clermont (1410–1434) and duke-peer of Bourbon
Charles I de Bourbon (1401–1456), count-peer of Clermont (1434–1456) and duke-peer of Bourbon
Jean II de Bourbon (1427–1488), count-peer of Clermont (1456–1488) and duke-peer of Bourbon
Gilbert de Bourbon (1443–1496), count-peer of Clermont (1488–1496)
Louis de Bourbon (1483–1501), count-peer of Clermont (1496–1501)
Charles III de Bourbon (1490–1527), count-peer of Clermont (1501–1527) and duke-peer of Bourbon
Louise of Savoy (1476–1531), countess-peeress of Clermont (1528–1531) and duchess-peeress of Anjou
Charles of France (1522–1545), count-peer of Clermont (1540–1545) and duke-peer of Angoulême

Maine
county-peerage in 1331, 8 holders 
John the Good (1319–1364), count-peer of Maine (1331–1350) and duke-peer of Normandy then king (John II) of France
Louis I d'Anjou (1339–1384), count-peer of Maine (1360–1384) and duke-peer of Anjou
Louis II d'Anjou (1377–1417), count-peer of Maine (1384–1417) and duke-peer of Anjou, king of Naples
Louis III d'Anjou (1403–1434), count-peer of Maine (1417–1434) and duke-peer of Anjou
Charles d'Anjou (1414–1472), count-peer of Maine (1434–1472)
Charles d'Anjou (1436–1481), count-peer of Maine (1472–1481) and duke-peer of Anjou
Louise of Savoy (1476–1531), countess-peeress of Maine (1515–1531) and duchess-peeress of Anjou
Louis of France (1755–1824), count-peer of Maine (1771–1790) and duke-peer of Anjou then king (Louis XVIII) of France

Orléans
duchy-peerage in 1344, 11 holders 
Philippe I d'Orléans (1336–1375), duke-peer of Orléans (1344–1375) and count-peer of Beaumont-le-Roger
Louis I d'Orléans (1372–1407), duke-peer of Orléans (1392–1407) and count-peer of Angoulême
Charles d'Orléans (1391–1465), duke-peer of Orléans (1407–1465)
Louis II d'Orléans (1462–1515), duke-peer of Orléans (1465–1498) then king (Louis XII) of France
Charles of France (1522–1545), duke-peer of Orléans (1540–1545) and of Angoulême
Gaston d'Orléans (1608–1660), duke-peer of Orléans (1626–1660)
Philippe II d'Orléans (1640–1701), duke-peer of Orléans (1661–1701)
Philippe III d'Orléans (1674–1723), duke-peer of Orléans (1701–1723)
Louis III d'Orléans (1703–1752), duke-peer of Orléans (1723–1752)
Louis-Philippe I d'Orléans (1725–1785), duke-peer of Orléans (1752–1785)
Louis-Philippe-Joseph d'Orléans (1747–1793), duke-peer of Orléans (1785–1790)

Valois
county then duchy, peerage in 1344, 11 holders 
Philip I d'Orléans (1336–1375), count-peer of Valois (1344–1375) and duke-peer of Orléans
Louis I d'Orléans (1372–1407), count then duke of Valois, peer (1386–1407) and of Orléans
Charles d'Orléans (1391–1465), duke-peer of Valois (1407–1465) and of Orléans
Louis II d'Orléans (1462–1515), duke-peer of Valois (1465–1498) and of Orléans then king (Louis XII) of France
Francis d'Angoulême (1494–1547), duke-peer of Valois (1498–1515) and count-peer of Angoulême then king (Francis I) of France
Gaston d'Orléans (1608–1660), duke-peer of Valois (1630–1661) and of Orléans
Philip II d'Orléans (1640–1701), duke-peer of Valois (1661–1701) and of Orléans
Philip III d'Orléans (1674–1723), duke-peer of Valois (1701–1723) and of Orléans
Louis III d'Orléans (1703–1752), duke-peer of Valois (1723–1752) and of Orléans
Louis-Philip I d'Orléans (1725–1785), duke-peer of Valois (1752–1785) and of Orléans
Louis-Philippe-Joseph d'Orléans (1747–1793), duke-peer of Valois (1785–1790) and of Orléans

Nevers
county then duchy, peerage in 1347, 18 holders 
Marguerite of France (v.1310-1382), countess-peeress of Nevers (1347–1382) and of Artois
Louis II de Dampierre (1330–1384), count-peer of Nevers (1347–1384) and of Flanders
Charles of Burgundy (1414–1464), count-peer of Nevers (1459–1464)
John of Burgundy (1415–1491), count-peer of Nevers (1464–1491)
Engelbert de Clèves (1462–1506), count-peer of Nevers (1505–1506)
Charles de Clèves (+1521), count-peer of Nevers (1506–1521)
Marie d'Albret (1492–1549), countess-peeress of Nevers (1521–1549)
François I de Clèves (1516–1562), duke-peer of Nevers (1539–1562)
François II de Clèves (1540–1563), duke-peer of Nevers (1562–1563)
Jacques de Clèves (1544–1564), duke-peer of Nevers (1563–1564)
Henriette de Clèves (1542–1601), duchess-peeress of Nevers (1564–1601)
Louis Gonzaga (1539–1595), duke-peer of Nevers (1566–1595)
Charles I Gonzaga (1580–1637), duke-peer of Nevers (1595–1637)
Charles III Gonzaga (1629–1665), duke-peer of Nevers (1637–1659)
Jules Mazarin (1602–1661), duke-peer of Nevers (1660–1661), cardinal
Philippe-Julien Mancini-Mazarin (1641–1707), duke-peer of Nevers (1661–1707)
Philippe-Jules Mancini-Mazarin (1676–1768), duke-peer of Nevers (1707–1730)
Louis-Jules Mancini-Mazarin (1716–1798), duke-peer of Nevers (1730–1790)

Rethel then Rethel-Mazarin
county then duchy, peerage in 1347, 14 holders 
Marguerite de France (v.1310-1382), countess-peeress of Rethel (1347–1382) and of Artois
Louis II de Dampierre (1330–1384), count-peer of Rethel (1347–1384) and of Flanders
Antoine de Burgundy (1384–1415), count-peer of Rethel (1405–1415)
Charles de Burgundy (1414–1464), count-peer of Rethel (1461–1464) and of Nevers
Jean de Burgundy (1415–1491), count-peer of Rethel (1464–1491) and of Nevers
Louis Gonzaga (1539–1595), count then duke of Rethel, peer (1573–1595) and of Nevers
Charles I Gonzaga (1580–1637), duke-peer of Rethel (1595–1622) and of Nevers
Charles II Gonzaga (1609–1631), duke-peer of Rethel (1622–1631)
Charles III Gonzaga (1629–1665), duke-peer of Rethel (1631–1659) and of Nevers
Hortense Mancini-Mazarin (1646–1699), duchess-peeress of Rethel-Mazarin (1663–1699)
Armand-Charles de La Porte (1632–1713), duke-peer of Rethel-Mazarin (1663–1713)
Paul-Jules de La Porte-Mazarin (1666–1731), duke-peer of Rethel-Mazarin (1713–1716)
Guy-Paul-Jules de La Porte-Mazarin (1708–1738), duke-peer of Rethel-Mazarin (1716–1738)
Louise-Jeanne de Durfort (1735–1781), duchess-peeress of Rethel-Mazarin (1738–1747)

Mid-14th century
Mantes-et-Meulan
county-peerage in 1354, 3 holders 
Charles the Bad (1332–1387), count-peer of Mantes-et-Meulan (1354–1364 and 1382–1387) and of Evreux, king (Charles II) of Navarre
Charles the Noble (1361–1425), count-peer of Mantes-et-Meulan (1387–1404) and of Evreux, king (Charles III) of Navarre
Francis of France (1554–1584), count-peer of Mantes-et-Meulan (1566–1584) and duke-peer of Anjou

Mâcon
county-peerage in 1359, 3 holders 
Jean de Berry (1340–1416), count-peer of Mâcon (1359–1360) and of Poitiers
Philip III the Good (1396–1467), count-peer of Mâcon (1435–1467) and duke-peer of Burgundy
Charles the Rash (1433–1477), count-peer of Mâcon (1467–1477) and duke-peer of Burgundy

Berry
duchy-peerage in 1360, 10 holders 
Jean de Berry (1340–1416), duke-peer of Berry (1360–1416) and count-peer of Poitiers
John of France (1398–1417), duke-peer of Berry (1416–1417) and count-peer of Poitiers, dauphin of France
Charles of France (1403–1461), duke-peer of Berry (1417–1422) and count-peer of Poitiers, dauphin of France then king (Charles VII) of France
Charles of France (1446–1472), duke-peer of Berry (1461–1465) then of Normandy
Marguerite d'Angoulême (1492–1549), duchess-peeress of Berry (1517–1549)
Henry d'Albret (1503–1555), duke-peer of Berry (1527–1549), king (Henry II) of Navarre
Marguerite of France (1523–1574), duchess-peeress of Berry (1550–1574)
Emmanuel-Philibert of Savoy (1528–1580), duke-peer of Berry (1559–1574), duke of Savoy
Francis of France (1554–1584), duke-peer of Berry (1576–1584) and of Anjou
Charles of France (1757–1836), duke-peer of Berry (1776–1790) and of Angoulême then king (Charles X) of France

Auvergne
duchy-peerage in 1360, 11 holders 
Jean de Berry (1340–1416), duke-peer of Auvergne (1360–1416) and of Berry
Jean I de Bourbon (1380–1434), duke-peer of Auvergne (1425–1434) and of Bourbon
Charles I de Bourbon (1401–1456), duke-peer of Auvergne (1434–1456) and of Bourbon
Jean II de Bourbon (1427–1488), duke-peer of Auvergne (1456–1488) and of Bourbon
Charles II de Bourbon (v.1434-1488), duke-peer of Auvergne (1488) and of Bourbon
Peter II de Bourbon (1439–1503), duke-peer of Auvergne (1488–1503) and of Bourbon
Suzanne de Bourbon (1491–1521), duchess-peeress of Auvergne (1503–1521) and of Bourbon
Charles III de Bourbon (1490–1527), duke-peer of Auvergne (1505–1527) and of Bourbon
Louise of Savoy (1476–1531), duchess-peeress of Auvergne (1528–1531) and of Anjou
Henry of France (1551–1589), duke-peer of Auvergne (1569–1574) and of Anjou then king (Henry III) of France
Charles of France (1757–1836), duke-peer of Auvergne (1773–1778) and of Angoulême then king (Charles X) of France

Touraine
duchy-peerage in 1360, 8 holders 
Philip the Bold (1342–1404), duke-peer of Touraine (1360–1364) then of Burgundy
Louis I d'Anjou (1339–1384), duke-peer of Touraine (1364) and of Anjou
Louis I d'Orléans (1372–1407), duke-peer of Touraine (1386–1392) then of Orléans
John of France (1398–1417), duke-peer of Touraine (1414–1416) and of Berry, dauphin of France
Charles of France (1403–1461), duke-peer of Touraine (1416–1422) and of Berry, dauphin of France then king (Charles VII) of France
Archibald Douglas (1369–1424), duke-peer of Touraine (1423–1424)
Louis III d'Anjou (1403–1434), duke-peer of Touraine (1424–1434) and of Anjou
Francis of France (1554–1584), duke-peer of Touraine (1576–1584) and of Anjou

Vertus
county-peerage in 1361, 4 holders 
Isabelle of France (1348–1373), countess-peeress of Vertus (1361–1373)
Gian Galeazzo Visconti (1351–1402), count-peer of Vertus (1361–1402), duke of Milan
Louis I d'Orléans (1372–1407), count-peer of Vertus (1403–1407) and duke-peer of Orléans
Philippe d'Orléans (1396–1420), count-peer of Vertus (1412–1420)

Alençon
county then duchy, peerage in 1367, 8 holders 
Peter II d'Alençon (1340–1404), count-peer of Alençon (1367–1404) and baron-peer of Châteauneuf
John IV d'Alençon (1385–1415), count then duke of Alençon, peer (1404–1415) and baron-peer of Châteauneuf
John V d'Alençon (v.1407-1476), duke-peer of Alençon (1415–1458 and 1461–1474) and baron-peer of Châteauneuf
René d'Alençon (v.1454-1492), duke-peer of Alençon (1483–1492) and baron-peer of Châteauneuf
Charles IV d'Alençon (1489–1525), duke-peer of Alençon (1492–1525) and baron-peer of Châteauneuf
Francis of France (1554–1584), duke-peer of Alençon (1566–1584) and of Anjou
Charles de Berry (1686–1714), duke-peer of Alençon (1710–1714) and of Angoulême
Louis of France (1755–1824), duke-peer of Alençon (1774–1790) and of Anjou then king (Louis XVIII) of France

Montpellier

barony-peerage in 1371, 1 holder
Charles the Bad (1332–1387), baron-peer of Montpellier (1371–1372) and count-peer of Evreux, king (Charles II) of Navarre

Forez
county-peerage in 1372, 10 holders 
Louis II de Bourbon (1337–1410), count-peer of Forez (1372–1410) and duke-peer of Bourbon
Jean I de Bourbon (1380–1434), count-peer of Forez (1410–1434) and duke-peer of Bourbon
Charles I de Bourbon (1401–1456), count-peer of Forez (1434–1456) and duke-peer of Bourbon
Jean II de Bourbon (1427–1488), count-peer of Forez (1456–1488) and duke-peer of Bourbon
Charles II de Bourbon (v.1434-1488), count-peer of Forez (1488) and duke-peer of Bourbon
Peter II de Bourbon (1439–1503), count-peer of Forez (1488–1503) and duke-peer of Bourbon
Suzanne de Bourbon (1491–1521), countess-peeress of Forez (1503–1521) and duchess-peeress of Bourbon
Charles III de Bourbon (1490–1527), count-peer of Forez (1505–1527) and duke-peer of Bourbon
Louise de Bourbon (1482–1562), countess-peeress of Forez (1530–1531)
Henry of France (1551–1589), count-peer of Forez (1566–1574) and duke-peer of Anjou then king (Henry III) of France

Roannais
barony then duchy, peerage in 1372, 11 holders 
Louis II de Bourbon (1337–1410), baron-peer of Roannais (1372–1410) and duke-peer of Bourbon
Jean I de Bourbon (1380–1434), baron-peer of Roannais (1410–1434) and duke-peer of Bourbon
Charles I de Bourbon (1401–1456), baron-peer of Roannais (1434–1456) and duke-peer of Bourbon
Jean II de Bourbon (1427–1488), baron-peer of Roannais (1456–1488)et duke-peer of Bourbon
Charles II de Bourbon (v.1434-1488), baron-peer of Roannais (1488) and duke-peer of Bourbon
Peter II de Bourbon (1439–1503), baron-peer of Roannais (1488–1503) and duke-peer of Bourbon
Suzanne de Bourbon (1491–1521), baroness-peeress of Roannais (1503–1515) and duchess-peeress of Bourbon
Artus Gouffier (1474–1519), duke-peer of Roannais (1519)
Artus Gouffier (1627–1696), duke-peer of Roannais (1642–1667)
François d'Aubusson de La Feuillade (1634–1691), duke-peer of Roannais (1667–1690)
Louis d'Aubusson de La Feuillade (1673–1725), peer with the courtesy title of duke of La Feuillade (1690–1691) then duke-peer of Roannais (1691–1725)

Blois
county-peerage in 1399, 4 holders 
Louis I d'Orléans (1372–1407), count-peer of Blois (1399–1407) and duke-peer of Orléans
Charles d'Orléans (1391–1465), count-peer of Blois (1407–1465) and duke-peer of Orléans
Louis II d'Orléans (1462–1515), count-peer of Blois (1465–1498) and duke-peer of Orléans then king (Louis XII) of France
Gaston d'Orléans (1608–1660), count-peer of Blois (1626–1660) and duke-peer of Orléans

Chartres
county then duchy, peerage in 1399, 9 holders 
Louis I d'Orléans (1372–1407), count-peer of Chartres (1399–1407) and duke-peer of Orléans
Charles d'Orléans (1391–1465), count-peer of Chartres (1407–1465) and duke-peer of Orléans
Louis II d'Orléans (1462–1515), count-peer of Chartres (1465–1498) and duke-peer of Orléans then king (Louis XII) of France
Gaston d'Orléans (1608–1660), duke-peer of Chartres (1626–1660) and of Orléans
Philippe II d'Orléans (1640–1701), duke-peer of Chartres (1661–1701) and of Orléans
Philippe III d'Orléans (1674–1723), duke-peer of Chartres (1701–1723) and of Orléans
Louis III d'Orléans (1703–1752), duke-peer of Chartres (1723–1752) and of Orléans
Louis-Philippe I d'Orléans (1725–1785), duke-peer of Chartres (1752–1785) and of Orléans
Louis-Philippe-Joseph d'Orléans (1747–1793), duke-peer of Chartres (1785–1790) and of Orléans

Dunois
viscounty then duchy, peerage in 1399, 4 holders 
Louis I d'Orléans (1372–1407), viscount-peer of Dunois (1399–1407) and duke-peer of Orléans
Charles d'Orléans (1391–1465), viscount-peer of Dunois (1407–1465) and duke-peer of Orléans
Louis II d'Orléans (1462–1515), viscount-peer of Dunois (1465–1498) and duke-peer of Orléans then king (Louis XII) of France
Louis d'Orléans (1510–1537), duke-peer of Dunois (1525–1537)

Fère-en-Tardenois
barony-peerage in 1399, 5 holders 
Louis I d'Orléans (1372–1407), baron-peer of Fère-en-Tardenois (1399–1407) and duke-peer of Orléans
Charles d'Orléans (1391–1465), baron-peer of Fère-en-Tardenois (1407–1465) and duke-peer of Orléans
Louis II d'Orléans (1462–1515), baron-peer of Fère-en-Tardenois (1465–1498) and duke-peer of Orléans then king (Louis XII) of France
Francis d'Angoulême (1494–1547), baron-peer of Fère-en-Tardenois (1498–1515) and count-peer of Angoulême then king (Francis I) of France
Louise of Savoy (1476–1531), baroness-peeress of Fère-en-Tardenois (1515–1531) and duchess-peeress of Anjou

Chateau-Thierry
duchy-peerage in 1400, 7 holders 
Louis I d'Orléans (1372–1407), duke-peer of Château-Thierry (1400–1407) and of Orléans
Francis of France (1554–1584), duke-peer of Château-Thierry (1566–1584) and of Anjou
Frédéric Maurice de La Tour d'Auvergne (1605–1652), duke-peer of Château-Thierry (1651–1652)
Godefroy-Maurice de La Tour d'Auvergne (1641–1721), duke-peer of Château-Thierry (1641–1721)
Emmanuel-Théodose de La Tour d'Auvergne (1668–1730), duke-peer of Château-Thierry (1721–1730)
Charles Godefroy de La Tour d'Auvergne (1706–1771), duke-peer of Château-Thierry (1730–1771)
Godefroy Charles de La Tour d'Auvergne (1728–1792), duke-peer of Château-Thierry (1771–1790)

Périgord
county-peerage in 1400, 2 holders 
Louis I d'Orléans (1372–1407), count-peer of Périgord (1400–1407) and duke-peer of Orléans
Charles d'Orléans (1391–1465), count-peer of Périgord (1407–1437) and duke-peer of Orléans

15th century

Soissons

county-peerage in 1404, 8 holders 
Louis I d'Orléans (1372–1407), count-peer of Soissons (1404–1407) and duke-peer of Orléans
Charles d'Orléans (1391–1465), count-peer of Soissons (1412–1465) and duke-peer of Orléans
Louis II d'Orléans (1462–1515), count-peer of Soissons (1465–1498) and duke-peer of Orléans then king (Louis XII) of France
Claude of France (1499–1524), countess-peeress of Soissons (1506–1524) and duchess-peeress of Brittany, queen of France
John de Bourbon (1528–1557), count-peer of Soissons (1542–1557)
Louis I de Bourbon-Condé (1530–1569), count-peer of Soissons (1557–1569)
Charles de Bourbon (1566–1612), count-peer of Soissons (1569–1612)
Louis de Bourbon (1604–1641), count-peer of Soissons (1612–1641)

Coucy

barony-peerage in 1404, 4 holders 
Louis I d'Orléans (1372–1407), baron-peer of Coucy (1404–1407) and duke-peer of Orléans
Charles d'Orléans (1391–1465), baron-peer of Coucy (1412–1465) and duke-peer of Orléans
Louis II d'Orléans (1462–1515), baron-peer of Coucy (1465–1498) and duke-peer of Orléans then king (Louis XII) of France
Claude of France (1499–1524), baroness-peeress of Coucy (1506–1515) and duchess-peeress of Brittany, queen of France

Nemours

duchy-peerage in 1404, 17 holders 
Charles the Noble (1361–1425), duke-peer of Nemours (1404–1425), king (Charles III) of Navarre
Blanche of Navarre (1385–1441), titular duchess of Nemours, peer (1437–1441), queen of Navarre
John II of Aragon (1397–1479), titular duke of Nemours, peer (1437–1441), king of Aragon and of Navarre
Charles de Viane (1421–1461), titular duke of Nemours, peer (1441–1461)
Bernard d'Armagnac (1402–1462), duke-peer of Nemours (1461–1462) and count-peer of La Marche
Eléonore de Bourbon (1412–1463), duchess-peeress of Nemours (1461–1463)
Jean d'Armagnac (1467–1500), duke-peer of Nemours (1484–1500)
Louis d'Armagnac (1472–1503), duke-peer of Nemours (1500–1503)
Marguerite d'Armagnac (+1503), duchess-peeress of Nemours (1503)
Charlotte d'Armagnac (+1504), duchess-peeress of Nemours (1503–1504)
Gaston de Foix (1489–1512), duke-peer of Nemours (1507–1512)
Germaine de Foix (v.1490-1538), duchess-peeress of Nemours (1517–1538)
Philippe II d'Orléans (1640–1701), duke-peer of Nemours (1672–1701) and of Orléans
Philippe III d'Orléans (1674–1723), duke-peer of Nemours (1701–1723) and of Orléans
Louis III d'Orléans (1703–1752), duke-peer of Nemours (1723–1752) and of Orléans
Louis-Philippe I d'Orléans (1725–1785), duke-peer of Nemours (1752–1785) and of Orléans
Louis-Philippe-Joseph d'Orléans (1747–1793), duke-peer of Nemours (1785–1790) and of Orléans

Châtillon-sur-Marne

barony-peerage in 1404, 2 holders 
Louis I d'Orléans (1372–1407), baron-peer of Châtillon (1404–1407)
Francis of France (1554–1584), baron-peer of Châtillon (1566–1584) and duke-peer of Anjou

Mortagne-lès-Tournay

barony-peerage in 1407, 1 holder
John of France (1398–1417), baron-peer of Mortagne-lès-Tournay (1407–1417) and duke-peer of Berry, dauphin of France

Évry-le-Châtel
châtellenie-peerage in 1408

Jouy-le-Châtel
châtellenie-peerage in 1408

Coulommiers

barony then duchy, peerage in 1410, 2 holders 
Peter d'Evreux (1366–1412), baron-peer of Coulommiers (1410–1412) and count-peer of Mortain
Henry II d'Orléans-Dunois (1595–1663), duke-peer of Coulommiers (1654–1663)

Ponthieu

county-peerage in 1412, 3 holders 
John of France (1398–1417), count-peer of Ponthieu (1412–1417) and duke-peer of Berry, dauphin of France
Charles de Berry (1686–1714), count-peer of Ponthieu (1710–1714) and duke-peer of Angoulême
Charles of France (1757–1836), count-peer of Ponthieu (1776–1790) and duke-peer of Angoulême then king (Charles X) of France

Saintonge

county-peerage in 1428, 1 holder
James I Stuart (1394–1437), count-peer of Saintonge (1428–1437), king of Scotland

Auxerre

county-peerage in 1435, 2 holders 
Philip III the Good (1396–1467), count-peer of Auxerre (1435–1467) and duke-peer of Burgundy
Charles the Rash (1467–1477), count-peer of Auxerre (1467–1477) and duke-peer of Burgundy

Mid-15th century
Foix

county-peerage in 1458, 8 holders 
Gaston IV de Foix (1422–1472), count-peer of Foix (1458–1472)
Francis-Phoebus (1466–1483), count-peer of Foix (1472–1483), king of Navarre
John d'Albret (1469–1516), count-peer of Foix (1484–1516), king (John III) of Navarre
Catherine de Foix (1470–1517), countess-peeress of Foix (1484–1517), queen of Navarre
Henry d'Albret (1503–1555), count-peer of Foix (1517–1555) and duke-peer of Berry, king (Henry II) of Navarre
Antoine de Bourbon (1518–1562), count-peer of Foix (1555–1562)
Jeanne d'Albret (1528–1572), countess-peeress of Foix (1555–1572), queen (Joan III) of Navarre
Henry de Bourbon (1553–1610), count-peer of Foix (1572–1589), king (Henry III) of Navarre, king (Henry IV) of France

Eu

county-peerage in 1458, 19 holders 
Charles d'Artois (1394–1472), count-peer of Eu (1458–1472)
John de Burgundy (1415–1491), count-peer of Eu (1472–1491) and of Nevers
Engelbert de Clèves (1462–1506), count-peer of Eu (1491–1506) and of Nevers
Charles de Clèves (+1521), count-peer of Eu (1506–1521) and of Nevers
François I de Clèves (1516–1562), count-peer of Eu (1521–1562) and duke-peer of Nevers
François II de Clèves (1540–1563), count-peer of Eu (1562–1563) and duke-peer of Nevers
Jacques de Clèves (1544–1564), count-peer of Eu (1563–1564) and duke-peer of Nevers
Antoine de Croÿ (1541–1567), count-peer of Eu (1566–1567)
Catherine de Clèves (1548–1633), countess-peeress of Eu (1566–1633)
Henri I de Lorraine (1549–1588), count-peer of Eu (1570–1588)
Charles de Lorraine (1571–1640), count-peer of Eu (1633–1640)
Henri II de Lorraine (1614–1664), count-peer of Eu (1640–1641 and 1643–1654)
Louis de Lorraine (1622–1654), count-peer of Eu (1654)
Louis-Joseph de Lorraine (1650–1671), count-peer of Eu (1654–1660)
Anne-Marie-Louise d'Orléans (1627–1693), countess-peeress of Eu (1660–1682)
Louis-Auguste I de Bourbon (1670–1736), count-peer of Eu (1694–1736)
Louis-Auguste II de Bourbon (1700–1755), count-peer of Eu (1736–1755)
Louis-Charles de Bourbon (1701–1775), count-peer of Eu (1701–1775)
Louis-Jean-Marie de Bourbon (1725–1793), count-peer of Eu (1776–1790)

Beaujeu

barony-peerage in 1466, 4 holders 
Jean II de Bourbon (1427–1488), baron-peer of Beaujeu (1466–1475) and duke-peer of Bourbon
Peter II de Bourbon (1439–1503), baron-peer of Beaujeu (1475–1503) and duke-peer of Bourbon
Charles III de Bourbon (1490–1527), baron-peer of Beaujeu (1505–1527) and duke-peer of Bourbon
Louise de Bourbon (1482–1561), baroness-peeress of Beaujeu (1530–1562) and countess-peeress of Forèz

Villefranche

county-peerage in 1480, 2 holders 
Frédéric of Aragon (1452–1504), count-peer of Villefranche (1480–1504), king (Frédéric IV) de Naples
Charlotte of Aragon (1480–1506), countess-peeress of Villefranche (1504–1506)

Civray

county-peerage in 1498, 3 holders 
Francis d'Angoulême (1494–1547), count-peer of Civray (1498–1515) and of Angoulême then king (Francis I) of France
Louise of Savoy (1476–1531), countess-peeress of Civray (1515–1531) and duchess-peeress of Anjou
Charles of France (1522–1545), count-peer of Civray (1540–1545) and duke-peer of Orléans

16th century

Vendôme

duchy-peerage in 1515, 7 holders 
Charles IV de Bourbon (1489–1537), duke-peer of Vendôme (1515–1537)
Antoine de Bourbon (1518–1562), duke-peer of Vendôme (1537–1562) and count-peer of Foix
Henri de Bourbon (1553–1610), duke-peer of Vendôme (1562–1589) and count-peer of Foix, king (Henry III) of Navarre, king (Henry IV) of France
César de Bourbon-Vendôme (1594–1665), duke-peer of Vendôme (1598–1665)
Louis de Bourbon-Vendôme (1612–1669), duke-peer of Vendôme (1665–1669)
Louis-Joseph de Bourbon-Vendôme (1654–1712), duke-peer of Vendôme (1669–1712)
Philip de Bourbon-Vendôme (1655–1727), titular duke of Vendôme (1712–1727), grand-prieur

Châtellerault

duchy-peerage in 1515, 6 holders 
François de Bourbon (1492–1515), duke-peer of Châtellerault (1515)
Charles III de Bourbon (1490–1527), duke-peer of Châtellerault (1515–1527) and of Bourbon
Louise of Savoy (1476–1531), duchess-peeress of Châtellerault (1527–1530) and of Anjou
Louise de Bourbon (1482–1561), duchess-peeress of Châtellerault (1530–1532) and baroness-peeress of Beaujeu
Louis II de Bourbon-Montpensier (1513–1582), duke-peer of Châtellerault (1530–1532) then of Montpensier
Charles of France (1522–1545), duke-peer of Châtellerault (1540–1545) and of Orléans

Guise

duchy-peerage in 1528, 12 holders 
Claude I de Lorraine (1496–1550), duke-peer of Guise (1528–1550)
Francis de Lorraine (1519–1563), duke-peer of Guise (1550–1563)
Henry I de Lorraine (1549–1588), duke-peer of Guise (1563–1588) and count-peer of Eu
Charles de Lorraine (1571–1640), duke-peer of Guise (1588–1640) and count-peer of Eu
Henry II de Lorraine (1614–1664), duke-peer of Guise (1640–1641 and 1643–1664) and count-peer of Eu
Louis-Joseph de Lorraine (1650–1671), duke-peer of Guise (1664–1671) and count-peer of Eu
François-Joseph de Lorraine (1670–1675), duke-peer of Guise (1671–1675)
Henri-Jules de Bourbon-Condé (1643–1709), duke-peer of Guise (1704–1709)
Anne Henriette of Bavaria (1648–1723), duchess-peeress of Guise (1704–1723)
Louis III de Bourbon-Condé (1668–1710), duke-peer of Guise (1709–1710) and of Bourbon
Louis-Henri de Bourbon-Condé (1692–1740), duke-peer of Guise (1710–1740) and of Bourbon
Louis-Joseph de Bourbon-Condé (1736–1818), duke-peer of Guise (1740–1790) and of Bourbon

Montpensier

duchy-peerage in 1539, 12 holders 
Louise de Bourbon (1482–1562), duchess-peeress of Montpensier (1539–1562) and baroness-peeress of Beaujeu
Louis II de Bourbon-Montpensier (1513–1582), duke-peer of Montpensier (1539–1582)
François de Bourbon-Montpensier (1542–1592), duke-peer of Montpensier (1582–1592)
Henri de Bourbon-Montpensier (1573–1608), duke-peer of Montpensier (1592–1608)
Marie de Bourbon-Montpensier (1605–1627), duchess-peeress of Montpensier (1608–1627)
Gaston d'Orléans (1608–1660), duke-peer of Montpensier (1626–1627) and of Orléans
Anne-Marie-Louise d'Orléans (1627–1693), duchess-peeress of Montpensier (1627–1693) and countess-peeress of Eu
Philippe II d'Orléans (1640–1701), duke-peer of Montpensier (1695–1701) and of Orléans
Philippe III d'Orléans (1674–1723), duke-peer of Montpensier (1701–1723) and of Orléans
Louis III d'Orléans (1703–1752), duke-peer of Montpensier (1723–1752) and of Orléans
Louis-Philippe I d'Orléans (1725–1785), duke-peer of Montpensier (1752–1785) and of Orléans
Louis-Philippe-Joseph d'Orléans (1747–1793), duke-peer of Montpensier (1785–1790) and of Orléans

Aumale

duchy-peerage in 1547, 10 holders 
Francis de Lorraine (1519–1563), duke-peer of Aumale (1547–1550) then of Guise
Claude II de Lorraine (1526–1573), duke-peer of Aumale (1550–1573)
Charles de Lorraine (1556–1631), duke-peer of Aumale (1573–1631)
Henry I of Savoy (1572–1632), duke-peer of Aumale (1631–1632)
Anne de Lorraine (1600–1638), duchess-peeress of Aumale (1631–1638)
Louis of Savoy (1621–1641), duke-peer of Aumale (1638–1641)
Charles-Amédée of Savoy (1624–1652), duke-peer of Aumale (1643–1652)
Louis-Auguste I de Bourbon (1670–1736), duke-peer of Aumale (1695–1736) and count-peer of Eu
Louis-Charles de Bourbon (1701–1775), duke-peer of Aumale (1736–1775) and count-peer of Eu
Louis-Jean-Marie de Bourbon (1725–1793), duke-peer of Aumale (1776–1790) and count-peer of Eu

Mid-16th century
Montmorency

duchy-peerage in 1551, 8 holders 
Anne de Montmorency (1493–1567), duke-peer of Montmorency (1551–1567)
François de Montmorency (1530–1579), duke-peer of Montmorency (1567–1579)
Henri I de Montmorency (1534–1614), duke-peer of Montmorency (1579–1613)
Henri II de Montmorency (1595–1632), duke-peer of Montmorency (1613–1632)
Henri II de Bourbon-Condé (1588–1646), duke-peer of Montmorency (1633–1646)
Charlotte-Marguerite de Montmorency (1594–1650), duchess-peeress of Montmorency (1633–1650)
Louis II de Bourbon-Condé (1621–1686), duke-peer of Montmorency (1646–1686) and of Bourbon
Henri-Jules de Bourbon-Condé (1643–1709), duke-peer of Montmorency (1686–1688) then of Enghien

Albret

duchy-peerage in 1556, 9 holders 
Antoine de Bourbon (1518–1562), duke-peer of Albret (1556–1562) and of Vendôme
Jeanne d'Albret (1528–1573), duchess-peeress of Albret (1556–1572) and countess-peeress of Foix, queen (Joan III) of Navarre
Henry de Bourbon (1553–1610), duke-peer of Albret (1572–1589) and of Vendôme, king (Henry III) of Navarre, king (Henry IV) of France
Henri II de Bourbon-Condé (1588–1646), duke-peer of Albret (1641–1646) and of Montmorency
Louis II de Bourbon-Condé (1621–1686), duke-peer of Albret (1646–1651) and of Montmorency
Frédéric Maurice de La Tour d'Auvergne (1605–1652), duke-peer of Albret (1651–1652) and of Château-Thierry
Godefroy-Maurice de La Tour d'Auvergne (1641–1721), duke-peer of Albret (1652–1713) and of Château-Thierry
Emmanuel-Théodose de La Tour d'Auvergne (1668–1730), duke-peer of Albret (1713–1730) and of Château-Thierry
Charles Godefroy de La Tour d'Auvergne (1706–1771), duke-peer of Albret (1730–1771) and of Château-Thierry

Enghien

duchy-peerage in 1566, 5 holders 
Louis I de Bourbon-Condé (1530–1569), duke-peer of Enghien (1566–1569) and count-peer of Soissons
Henri-Jules de Bourbon-Condé (1643–1709), duke-peer of Enghien (1688–1709) and of Guise
Louis III de Bourbon-Condé (1668–1710), duke-peer of Enghien (1709–1710) and of Bourbon
Louis-Henri de Bourbon-Condé (1692–1740), duke-peer of Enghien (1710–1740) and of Bourbon
Louis-Joseph de Bourbon-Condé (1736–1818), duke-peer of Enghien (1740–1790) and of Bourbon

Perche

county-peerage in 1566, 2 holders 
Francis of France (1554–1584), count-peer of Perche (1566–1584) and duke-peer of Anjou
Louis of France (1755–1824), count-peer of Perche (1771–1790) and duke-peer of Anjou then king (Louis XVIII) of France

Graville

duchy-peerage in 1567, 1 holder
Charles de Bourbon (1523–1590), duke-peer of Graville (1567–1590), cardinal

Penthièvre

duchy-peerage in 1569, 8 holders 
Sébastien de Luxembourg (+1569), duke-peer of Penthièvre (1569)
Marie de Luxembourg (1563–1623), duchess-peeress of Penthièvre (1569–1608)
Philippe-Emmanuel de Lorraine (1558–1602), duke-peer of Penthièvre (1575–1602)
Françoise de Lorraine (1592–1669), duchess-peeress of Penthièvre (1608–1669)
César de Bourbon-Vendôme (1594–1665), duke-peer of Penthièvre (1609–1665) and of Vendôme
Louis-Joseph de Bourbon-Vendôme (1654–1712), duke-peer of Penthièvre (1669–1687) et de Vendôme
Louis-Alexandre de Bourbon (1678–1737), duke-peer of Penthièvre (1697–1737)
Louis-Jean-Marie de Bourbon (1725–1793), duke-peer of Penthièvre (1737–1790) and of Aumale

Dreux

county-peerage in 1569, 1 holder
Francis of France (1554–1584), count-peer of Dreux (1569–1584) and duke-peer of Anjou

Mercœur

duchy-peerage in 1569, 9 holders 
Nicolas de Lorraine (1524–1577), duke-peer of Mercœur (1569–1577)
Philippe-Emmanuel de Lorraine (1558–1602), duke-peer of Mercœur (1577–1602) and of Penthièvre
Françoise de Lorraine (1592–1669), duchess-peeress of Mercœur (1608–1649) and of Penthièvre
César de Bourbon-Vendôme (1594–1665), duke-peer of Mercœur (1609–1649) and of Vendôme
Louis de Bourbon-Vendôme (1612–1669), duke-peer of Mercœur (1649–1669) and of Vendôme
Louis-Joseph de Bourbon-Vendôme (1654–1712), duke-peer of Mercœur (1669–1712) and of Vendôme
Louis-Armand II de Bourbon-Conti (1696–1727), duke-peer of Mercœur (1723–1727)
Louis-Francis I de Bourbon-Conti (1717–1776), duke-peer of Mercœur (1727–1770)
Charles of France (1757–1836), duke-peer of Mercœur (1773–1778) and of Angoulême then king (Charles X) of France

Clermont-Tonnerre

duchy-peerage in 1571, 3 holders 
Henry de Clermont-Tonnerre (+1573), duke-peer of Clermont-Tonnerre (1571–1573)
Gaspard de Clermont-Tonnerre (1688–1781), duke-peer of Clermont-Tonnerre (1775–1781)
Charles-Henri de Clermont-Tonnerre (1720–1794), duke-peer of Clermont-Tonnerre (1781–1790)

Uzès

duchy-peerage in 1572, 9 holders (the oldest peerage with a surviving heir) 
Antoine de Crussol (1528–1573), duke-peer of Uzès (1572–1573)
Jacques de Crussol (1540–1594), duke-peer of Uzès (1573–1594)
Emmanuel de Crussol (1578–1657), duke-peer of Uzès (1594–1657)
François de Crussol (1604–1680), duke-peer of Uzès (1657–1674)
Emmanuel de Crussol (1642–1692), peer with the courtesy title of duke of Crussol (1674–1680) then duke-peer of Uzès (1680–1692)
Louis de Crussol (1673–1693), duke-peer of Uzès (1692–1693)
Jean-Charles de Crussol (1675–1739), duke-peer of Uzès (1693–1725)
Charles-Emmanuel de Crussol (1707–1762), peer with the courtesy title of duke of Crussol (1725–1739) then duke-peer of Uzès (1739–1753)
Francis-Emmanuel de Crussol (1728–1802), peer with the courtesy title of duke of Crussol (1753–1762) then duke-peer of Uzès (1762–1790)

Mayenne

duchy-peerage in 1573, 7 holders 
Charles de Lorraine (1554–1611), duke-peer of Mayenne (1573–1611)
Henri de Lorraine (1578–1621), duke-peer of Mayenne (1611–1621)
Francesco Gonzaga (1606–1622), duke-peer of Mayenne (1621–1622)
Charles II Gonzaga (1609–1631), duke-peer of Mayenne (1622–1626) and of Rethel
Ferdinand Gonzaga (1611–1631), duke-peer of Mayenne (1626–1631)
Charles III Gonzaga(1629–1665), duke-peer of Mayenne (1631–1654) and of Nevers
Jules Mazarin (1602–1661), duke-peer of Mayenne (1656–1661) and of Nevers, cardinal

Saint-Fargeau

duchy-peerage in 1575, 6 holders 
François de Bourbon-Montpensier (1542–1592), duke-peer of Saint-Fargeau (1575–1592) and of Montpensier
Renée d'Anjou-Mézières (1550–1597), duchess-peeress of Saint-Fargeau (1575–1597)
Henry de Bourbon-Montpensier (1573–1608), duke-peer of Saint-Fargeau (1592–1608) and of Montpensier
Marie de Bourbon-Montpensier (1605–1627), duchess-peeress of Saint-Fargeau (1608–1627) and of Montpensier
Gaston d'Orléans (1608–1660), duke-peer of Saint-Fargeau (1626–1627) and of Orléans
Anne-Marie-Louise d'Orléans (1627–1693), duchess-peeress of Saint-Fargeau (1627–1693) and of Montpensier

Joyeuse

duchy-peerage in 1581, 11 holders 
Anne de Joyeuse (1561–1587), duke-peer of Joyeuse (1581–1587)
François de Joyeuse (1562–1615), duke-peer of Joyeuse (1587–1590), cardinal
Antoine-Scipion de Joyeuse (1565–1592), duke-peer of Joyeuse (1590–1592)
Henry de Joyeuse (1567–1608), duke-peer of Joyeuse (1592–1608)
Henriette Catherine de Joyeuse (1585–1656), duchess-peeress of Joyeuse (1608–1647)
Charles de Lorraine (1571–1640), duke-peer of Joyeuse (1611–1640) and of Guise
Louis de Lorraine (1622–1654), duke-peer of Joyeuse (1647–1654) and count-peer of Eu
Louis-Joseph de Lorraine (1650–1671), duke-peer of Joyeuse (1654–1671) and of Guise
Francis-Joseph de Lorraine (1670–1675), duke-peer of Joyeuse (1671–1675) and of Guise
Marie de Lorraine (1615–1688), duchess-peeress of Joyeuse (1675–1688)
Louis de Melun (1694–1724), duke-peer of Joyeuse (1714–1724)

Piney-Luxembourg

duchy-peerage in 1581, 10 holders 
François de Luxembourg (+1613), duke-peer of Piney-Luxembourg (1581–1613)
Henri de Luxembourg (1582–1616), duke-peer of Piney-Luxembourg (1613–1616)
Marguerite-Charlotte de Luxembourg (1607–1680), duchess-peeress of Piney-Luxembourg (1616–1661)
Léon d'Albert (1582–1630), duke-peer of Piney-Luxembourg (1620–1630)
Henri-Léon d'Albert (1630–1697), duke-peer of Piney-Luxembourg (1630–1661)
Madeleine-Charlotte de Clermont-Tonnerre (1635–1701), duchess-peeress of Piney-Luxembourg (1661–1701)
François-Henri de Montmorency (1628–1695), duke-peer of Piney-Luxembourg (1661–1695)
Charles-Frédéric de Montmorency (1662–1726), duke-peer of Piney-Luxembourg (1695–1726)
Charles-Frédéric de Montmorency (1702–1764), duke-peer of Piney-Luxembourg (1726–1764)
Anne-Charles de Montmorency (1737–1803), duke-peer of Piney-Luxembourg (1769–1790)

Épernon

duchy-peerage in 1581, 2 holders 
Jean-Louis de Nogaret (1554–1642), duke-peer of Epernon (1581–1642)
Bernard de Nogaret (1592–1661), duke-peer of Epernon (1642–1661)

Elbeuf

duchy-peerage in 1581, 6 holders 
Charles de Lorraine (1566–1605), duke-peer of Elbeuf (1581–1605)
Charles de Lorraine (1596–1657), duke-peer of Elbeuf (1605–1657)
Charles de Lorraine (1620–1692), duke-peer of Elbeuf (1657–1692)
Henri de Lorraine (1661–1748), duke-peer of Elbeuf (1692–1748)
Emmanuel-Maurice de Lorraine (1677–1763), duke-peer of Elbeuf (1748–1763)
Charles-Eugène de Lorraine (1751–1825), duke-peer of Elbeuf (1763–1790)

Retz

duchy-peerage in 1581, 4 holders 
Albert de Gondi (1522–1602), duke-peer of Retz (1581–1602)
Claude Catherine de Clermont (1543–1604), duchess-peeress of Retz (1581–1604)
Henri de Gondi (1590–1659), duke-peer of Retz (1602–1633)
Pierre de Gondi (1602–1676), duke-peer of Retz (1633–1679)

Brienne

duchy-peerage in 1587, 1 holder 
Charles de Luxembourg (1572–1608), duke-peer of Brienne (1587–1608)

Hallwin
duchy-peerage in 1587, 6 holders
Charles I d'Hallwin (1544–1594), duke-peer of Hallwin (1587–1594)
Anne Chabot (v.1544-1611), duchess-peeress of Hallwin (1587–1611)
Charles II d'Hallwin (1591–1598), duke-peer of Hallwin (1594–1598)
Anne d'Hallwin (v.1590-1641), duchess-peeress of Hallwin (1598–1641)
Henri de Nogaret (1591–1639), duke-peer of Hallwin (1606–1620) then of Candale
Charles de Schomberg (1601–1656), duke-peer of Hallwin (1621–1656)

Montbazon

duchy-peerage in 1588, 9 holders 
Louis de Rohan (1562–1608), duke-peer of Montbazon (1588–1589)
Hercule de Rohan (1568–1654), duke-peer of Montbazon (1594–1654)
Louis de Rohan (1598–1667), duke-peer of Montbazon (1654–1667)
Charles de Rohan (1633–1699), duke-peer of Montbazon (1667–1678)
Charles de Rohan (1655–1727), duke-peer of Montbazon (1678–1727)
Hercule-Mériadec de Rohan (1688–1757), duke-peer of Montbazon (1727–1757)
Jules-Hercule de Rohan (1726–1788), duke-peer of Montbazon (1757–1788)
Henri-Louis de Rohan (1745–1809), duke-peer of Montbazon (1788)
Charles-Alain de Rohan (1764–1836), duke-peer of Montbazon (1788–1790)

Ventadour

duchy-peerage in 1589, 5 holders 
Gilbert de Lévis (+1591), duke-peer of Ventadour (1589–1591)
Anne de Lévis (1569–1622), duke-peer of Ventadour (1591–1620)
Henry de Lévis (1596–1680), duke-peer of Ventadour (1620–1631)
Charles de Lévis (1600–1649), duke-peer of Ventadour (1631–1649)
Louis-Charles de Lévis (1647–1717), duke-peer of Ventadour (1649–1717)

Beaufort

duchy-peerage in 1597, 5 holders 
Gabrielle d'Estrées (1573–1599), duchess-peeress of Beaufort (1597–1598)
César de Bourbon-Vendôme (1594–1665), duke-peer of Beaufort (1598–1649) and of Vendôme
François de Bourbon-Vendôme (1616–1669), duke-peer of Beaufort (1649–1669)
Louis de Bourbon-Vendôme (1612–1669), duke-peer of Beaufort (1669) and of Vendôme
Louis-Joseph de Bourbon-Vendôme (1654-1712), duke-peer of Beaufort (1669–1688) and of Vendôme

Thouars

duchy-peerage in 1595, 7 holders 
Claude de La Trémoïlle (1566–1604), duke-peer of Thouars (1595–1604)
Henri de La Trémoille (1598–1674), duke-peer of Thouars (1604–1656)
Henri-Charles de La Trémoïlle (1620–1672), duke-peer of Thouars (1656–1672)
Charles de La Trémoïlle (1655–1709), duke-peer of Thouars (1672–1709)
Charles-Louis de La Trémoïlle (1683–1719), duke-peer of Thouars (1709–1719)
Charles-Armand de La Trémoïlle (1708–1741), duke-peer of Thouars (1719–1741)
Charles-Godefroy de La Trémoïlle (1737–1792), duke-peer of Thouars (1741–1790)

Biron

duchy-peerage in 1598, 8 holders 
Charles de Gontaut (1562–1602), duke-peer of Biron (1598–1602)
Charles-Armand de Gontaut (1663–1756), duke-peer of Biron (1723–1733)
Francis-Armand de Gontaut (1689–1736), duke-peer of Biron (1733–1736)
Antoine-Charles de Gontaut (1717–1739), duke-peer of Biron (1736–1739)
Jean-Louis de Gontaut (1692–1777), duke-peer of Biron (1739), abbé
Louis Antoine de Gontaut (1701–1788), duke-peer of Biron (1739–1788)
Charles-Antoine de Gontaut (1708–1798), duke-peer of Biron (1788)
Armand Louis de Gontaut (1747–1793), duke-peer of Biron (1788–1790)

Aiguillon

duchy-peerage in 1599, 6 holders 
Henry de Lorraine (1578–1621), duke-peer of Aiguillon (1599–1621) and of Mayenne
Marie-Madeleine de Vignerot du Plesssis (1604–1675), duchess-peeress of Aiguillon (1638–1675)
Marie-Thérèse de Vignerot du Plessis (1636–1704), duchess-peeress of Aiguillon (1675–1704)
Armand Louis de Vignerot du Plessis (1683–1750), duke-peer of Aiguillon (1731–1740)
Emmanuel Armand de Vignerot du Plessis (1720–1788), peer with the courtesy title of duke of Agenois (1740–1750) then duke-peer of Aiguillon (1750–1788)
Armand Désiré de Vignerot du Plessis(1761–1800), duke-peer of Aiguillon (1788–1790)

17th century

Rohan
duchy-peerage in 1603, 6 holders 
Henri de Rohan (1579–1638), duke-peer of Rohan (1603–1638)
Henri Chabot (1615–1655), duke-peer of Rohan (1648–1655)
Marguerite de Rohan (1617–1684), duchess-peeress of Rohan (1648–1678)
Louis de Rohan-Chabot (1652–1727), duke-peer of Rohan (1678–1708)
Louis de Rohan-Chabot (1679–1738), duke-peer of Rohan (1708–1738)
Louis de Rohan-Chabot (1710–1791), duke-peer of Rohan (1738–1790)

Sully
duchy-peerage in 1606, 8 holders 
Maximilian de Béthune (1560–1641), duke-peer of Sully (1606–1641)
Maximilien-François de Béthune (1615–1661), duke-peer of Sully (1641–1661)
Maximilien-Pierre de Béthune (1640–1694), duke-peer of Sully (1661–1694)
Maximilien-Nicolas de Béthune (1664–1712), duke-peer of Sully (1694–1712)
Maximilien-Henri de Béthune (1669–1729), duke-peer of Sully (1712–1729)
Louis-Maximilian de Béthune (1685–1761), duke-peer of Sully (1729–1761)
Maximilien-Antoine de Béthune (1730–1786), duke-peer of Sully (1761–1786)
Maximilien-Gabriel de Béthune (1756–1800), duke-peer of Sully (1786–1790)

Fronsac
duchy-peerage in 1608, 9 holders 
François d'Orléans-Dunois (1570–1631), duke-peer of Fronsac (1608–1631)
Armand-Jean du Plessis (1585–1642), duke-peer of Fronsac (1634–1642), cardinal de Richelieu
Jean Armand de Maillé (1619–1646), duke-peer of Fronsac (1642–1646)
Claire-Clémence de Maillé (1628–1694), duchess-peeress of Fronsac (1646–1674)
Louis II de Bourbon-Condé (1621–1686), duke-peer of Fronsac (1646–1674) and of Bourbon
Armand Jean de Vignerot du Plessis (1629–1718), duke-peer of Fronsac (1674–1711)
Louis-Armand de Vignerot du Plessis (1696–1788), duke-peer of Fronsac (1711–1764)
Louis-Antoine de Vignerot du Plessis (1736–1791), duke-peer of Fronsac (1764–1788) then of Richelieu
Armand-Emmanuel de Vignerot du Plessis (1766–1822), duke-peer of Fronsac (1788–1790)

Damville
duchy-peerage in 1610, 4 holders 
Charles de Montmorency (1537–1612), duke-peer of Damville (1610–1612)
Henri II de Montmorency (1595–1632), duke-peer of Damville (1612–1632) and of Montmorency
François-Christophe de Lévis (1603–1661), duke-peer of Damville (1648–1661)
Louis-Alexandre de Bourbon (1678–1737), duke-peer of Damville (1694–1719) and of Penthièvre

Brissac
duchy-peerage in 1611, 9 holders 
Charles de Cossé (1550–1621), duke-peer of Brissac (1611–1621)
François de Cossé (1581–1651), duke-peer of Brissac (1621–1644)
Louis de Cossé (1625–1661), duke-peer of Brissac (1644–1661)
Henri-Albert de Cossé (1645–1698), duke-peer of Brissac (1661–1698)
Artus-Timoléon de Cossé (1668–1703), duke-peer of Brissac (1698–1702)
Charles-Timoléon de Cossé (1693–1732), duke-peer of Brissac (1702–1732)
Jean-Paul-Timoléon de Cossé (1698–1780), duke-peer of Brissac (1732–1756)
Louis-Joseph de Cossé (1733–1759), peer with the courtesy title of duke of Cossé (1756–1759)
Louis-Hercule de Cossé (1734–1792), peer with the courtesy title of duke of Cossé (1760–1780) then duke-peer of Brissac (1780–1790)

Grancey
duchy-peerage in December 1611, 1 holder
Guillaume de Hautemer (1538–1613), duke-peer of Grancey (1611–1613)

Lesdiguières
duchy-peerage in 1611, 6 holders 
François de Bonne (1543–1626), duke-peer of Lesdiguières (1611–1626)
Charles de Blanchefort (1578–1638), duke-peer of Lesdiguières (1626–1638)
François de Bonne de Blanchefort (1596–1677), duke-peer of Lesdiguières (1638–1675)
François-Emmanuel de Bonne de Blanchefort (1645–1681), peer with the courtesy title of duke of Sault (1675–1677) then duke-peer of Lesdiguières (1677–1681)
Jean-François-Paul de Bonne de Blanchefort (1678–1703), duke-peer of Lesdiguières (1681–1703)
Alphonse de Bonne de Blanchefort (1626–1711), duke-peer of Lesdiguières (1702–1711)

Chevreuse
duchy-peerage in 1612, 1 holder
Claude de Lorraine (1578–1657), duke-peer of Chevreuse (1612–1657)

Châteauroux
duchy-peerage in 1616, 6 holders 
Henri II de Bourbon-Condé (1588–1646), duke-peer of Châteauroux (1616–1646) and of Albret
Louis II de Bourbon-Condé (1621–1686), duke-peer of Châteauroux (1646–1686) and of Bourbon
Henri-Jules de Bourbon-Condé (1643–1709), duke-peer of Châteauroux (1686–1709) and of Guise
Louis de Bourbon-Condé (1709–1771), duke-peer of Châteauroux (1710–1736)
Anne-Marie de Mailly (1717–1744), duchess-peeress of Châteauroux (1743–1744)
Charles of France (1757–1836), duke-peer of Châteauroux (1776–1790) and of Angoulême then king (Charles X) of France

Luynes
duchy-peerage in 1619, 6 holders 
Charles d'Albert (1577–1621), duke-peer of Luynes (1619–1621)
Louis-Charles d'Albert (1620–1690), duke-peer of Luynes (1621–1685)
Charles-Honoré d'Albert (1646–1712), peer with the courtesy title of duke of Chevreuse (1685–1690) then duke-peer of Luynes (1690–1712)
Charles-Philippe d'Albert (1695–1758), duke-peer of Luynes (1712–1758)
Charles-Louis d'Albert (1717–1771), duke-peer of Luynes (1758–1771)
Louis-Charles d'Albert (1748–1807), duke-peer of Luynes (1771–1790)

Bellegarde
duchy-peerage in 1619, 1 holder 
Roger de Saint-Lary de Termes (1562–1646), duke-peer of Bellegarde (1619–1646)

Candale
duchy-peerage in 1621, 1 holder 
Henry de Nogaret (1591–1639), duke-peer of Candale (1621–1639)

Chaulnes
duchy-peerage in 1621, 7 holders 
Honoré d'Albert d'Ailly (1581–1649), duke-peer of Chaulnes (1621–1649)
Henri-Louis d'Albert d'Ailly (1621–1653), duke-peer of Chaulnes (1649–1653)
Charles d'Albert d'Ailly (1625–1698), duke-peer of Chaulnes (1653–1698)
Louis-Auguste d'Albert d'Ailly (1676–1744), duke-peer of Chaulnes (1711–1729)
Charles-François d'Albert d'Ailly (1707–1731), peer with the courtesy title of duke of Picquigny (1729–1731)
Michel Ferdinand d'Albert d'Ailly (1714–1769), peer with the courtesy title of duke of Picquigny (1731–1744) then duke-peer of Chaulnes (1744–1769)
Joseph Louis d'Albert d'Ailly (1741–1792), duke-peer of Chaulnes (1769–1790)

La Roche-Guyon
duchy-peerage in 1621, 2 holders 
François de Silly (1586–1628), duke-peer of La Roche-Guyon (1621–1628)
Roger du Plessis-Liancourt (1598–1674), duke-peer of La Roche-Guyon (1643–1674)

La Rochefoucauld
duchy-peerage in 1622, 6 holders 
François V de La Rochefoucauld (1588–1650), duke-peer of La Rochefoucauld (1622–1650)
François VI de La Rochefoucauld (1613–1680), duke-peer of La Rochefoucauld (1650–1671)
François VII de La Rochefoucauld (1634–1714), duke-peer of La Rochefoucauld (1671–1713)
François VIII de La Rochefoucauld (1663–1728), duke-peer of La Rochefoucauld (1713–1728)
Alexandre de La Rochefoucauld (1690–1762), duke-peer of La Rochefoucauld (1728–1762)
Louis-Alexandre de La Rochefoucauld (1743–1792), duke-peer of La Rochefoucauld (1762–1790)

La Valette
duchy-peerage in 1622, 2 holders 
Bernard de Nogaret (1592–1661), duke-peer of La Valette (1622–1649 and 1658–1661) and of Epernon
Louis-Charles de Nogaret (1627–1658), duke-peer of La Valette (1649–1658)

Frontenay
duchy-peerage in 1626, 1 holder 
Benjamin de Rohan (1585–1642), duke-peer of Frontenay (1626–1642)

Richelieu
duchy-peerage in 1631, 4 holders 
Armand-Jean du Plessis (1585–1642), duke-peer of Richelieu (1631–1642) and of Fronsac, cardinal
Armand-Jean de Vignerot du Plessis (1629–1718), duke-peer of Richelieu (1642–1715) and of Fronsac
Louis-Armand de Vignerot du Plessis (1696–1788), duke-peer of Richelieu (1715–1788) and of Fronsac
Louis-Antoine de Vignerot du Plessis (1736–1791), duke-peer of Richelieu (1788–1790)

Puylaurens
duchy-peerage in 1634, 1 holder 
Antoine de L'Age (1602–1635), duke-peer of Puylaurens (1634–1635)

Saint-Simon
duchy-peerage in 1635, 4 holders 
Claude de Rouvroy (1607–1693), duke-peer of Saint-Simon (1635–1693)
Louis de Rouvroy (1675–1755), duke-peer of Saint-Simon (1693–1723 and 1754–1755)
Jacques-Louis de Rouvroy (1698–1746), peer with the courtesy title of duke of Ruffec (1723–1746)
Armand-Jean de Rouvroy (1699–1754), peer with the courtesy title of duke of Ruffec (1746–1754)

La Force
duchy-peerage in 1637, 7 holders 
Jacques-Nompar de Caumont (1558–1652), duke-peer of La Force (1637–1652)
Armand-Nompar de Caumont (1580–1675), duke-peer of La Force (1652–1675)
Henri-Nompar de Caumont (1582–1678), duke-peer of La Force (1675–1678)
Jacques-Nompar de Caumont (1632–1699), duke-peer of La Force (1678–1698)
Henri-Jacques de Caumont (1675–1726), peer with the courtesy title of duke of Caumont (1698–1699) then duke-peer of La Force (1699–1726)
Armand-Nompar de Caumont (1679–1764), duke-peer of La Force (1726–1730 and 1755–1764)
Jacques-Nompar de Caumont (1714–1755), peer with the courtesy title of duke of Caumont (1730–1755)

Valentinois
duchy-peerage in 1642, 6 holders 
Honoré II, Prince of Monaco (1597–1662), duke-peer of Valentinois (1642–1659)
Louis I, Prince of Monaco (1642–1701), duke-peer of Valentinois (1659–1701)
Antoine I, Prince of Monaco (1661–1731), duke-peer of Valentinois (1701–1715)
Jacques Goyon-Matignon (1689–1751), duke-peer of Valentinois (1715–1751)
Honoré III, Prince of Monaco (1720–1795), duke-peer of Valentinois (1751–1777)
Honoré IV, Prince of Monaco (1759–1818), duke-peer of Valentinois (1777–1790)

Gramont
duchy-peerage in 1643, 7 holders 
Antoine II de Gramont (1572–1644), duke-peer of Gramont (1643–1644)
Antoine III de Gramont (1604–1678), duke-peer of Gramont (1648–1678)
Antoine IV Charles de Gramont (1640–1720) duke-peer of Gramont (1678–1695)
Antoine V de Gramont (1672–1725), peer with the courtesy title of duke of Guiche (1695–1713), duke of Gramont in 1720
Antoine-Armand de Gramont (1688–1741), peer with the courtesy titles of duke of Louvigny (1713–1720) then of Guiche (1720–1725) then duke-peer of Gramont (1725–1741)
Louis-Antoine de Gramont (1689–1745), duke-peer of Gramont (1741–1745)
Antoine-Antonin de Gramont (1722–1801), duke-peer of Gramont (1745–1790)

Coligny
duchy-peerage in 1643, 2 holders 
Gaspard III de Coligny (1584–1646), duke-peer of Coligny (1643–1646)
Gaspard IV de Coligny (1620–1649), duke-peer of Coligny (1648–1649)

Châtillon/Loing
duchy-peerage in 1646, 1 holder 
Gaspard IV de Coligny (1620–1649), duke-peer of Châtillon (1646–1648) then of Coligny

Estrées
duchy-peerage in 1648, 5 holders 
François-Annibal I d'Estrées (1573–1670), duke-peer of Estrées (1648–1670)
François-Annibal II d'Estrées (1623–1687), duke-peer of Estrées (1670–1687)
François-Annibal III d'Estrées (1648–1698), duke-peer of Estrées (1687–1698)
Louis-Armand d'Estrées (1682–1723), duke-peer of Estrées (1698–1723)
Victor-Marie d'Estrées (1660–1737), duke-peer of Estrées (1723–1737)

Tresmes/Gesvres
duchy-peerage in 1648, 6 holders 
René Potier (1579–1670), duke-peer of Tresmes (1648–1669)
Léon Potier (1620–1704), duke-peer of Tresmes then of Gesvres (1669–1703)
François-Bernard Potier (1655–1739), duke-peer of Gesvres (1703–1722)
François-Joachim Potier (1692–1757), duke-peer of Gesvres (1722–1757)
Léon-Louis Potier (1695–1774), duke-peer of Gesvres (1757–1774)
Louis-Joachim Potier (1733–1794), duke-peer of Gesvres (1774–1790)

Mid-17th century
Arpajon
duchy-peerage in 1650, 1 holder 
Louis d'Arpajon (1590–1679), duke-peer of Arpajon (1650–1679)

Lavedan
duchy-peerage in 1650, 2 holders 
Philippe de Montaut-Navailles (1579–1654), duke-peer of Lavedan (1650–1654)
Philippe de Montaut-Navailles (1619–1684), duke-peer of Lavedan (1654–1660) then of Montaut

Mortemart
duchy-peerage in 1650, 10 holders 
Gabriel de Rochechouart (1600–1675), duke-peer of Mortemart (1650–1674)
Louis-Victor de Rochechouart (1636–1688), duke-peer of Mortemart (1674–1679)
Louis de Rochechouart (1663–1688), duke-peer of Mortemart (1679–1688)
Louis de Rochechouart (1681–1746), duke-peer of Mortemart (1688–1730 and 1743–1746)
Paul-Louis de Rochechouart (1711–1731), duke-peer of Mortemart (1730–1731)
Charles-Auguste de Rochechouart (1714–1743), duke-peer of Mortemart (1732–1743)
Louis-François de Rochechouart (1739–1743), duke-peer of Mortemart (1743)
Jean-Baptiste de Rochechouart (1682–1757), duke-peer of Mortemart (1746–1753)
Jean-Victor de Rochechouart (1712–1771), peer with the courtesy title of duke of Rochechouart (1753–1757) then duke-peer of Mortemart (1757–1771)
Victurnien-Jean-Baptiste de Rochechouart (1752–1812), duke-peer of Mortemart (1771–1790)

Noirmoutier
duchy-peerage in 1650, 1 holder 
François-Marie de L'Hospital (1618–1679), duke-peer of Vitry (1650–1679)

La Vieuville
duchy-peerage in 1651, 2 holders 
Charles de La Vieuville (1582–1653), duke-peer of La Vieuville (1651–1653)
Charles de La Vieuville (1619–1689), duke-peer of La Vieuville (1653–1689)

Rosnay
duchy-peerage in 1651, 1 holder 
François de L'Hospital (1583–1660), duke-peer of Rosnay (1651–1660)

Villemor
duchy-peerage in 1651, 1 holder 
Pierre Séguier (1588–1672), duke-peer of Villemor (1651–1663)

Villeroy
duchy-peerage in 1651, 5 holders 
Nicolas de Neufville (1598–1685), duke-peer of Villeroy (1651–1675)
François de Neufville (1644–1730), duke-peer of Villeroy (1675–1694)
Nicolas-Louis de Neufville (1663–1734), duke-peer of Villeroy (1694–1722)
Louis-François de Neufville (1695–1766), peer with the courtesy title of duke of Retz (1722–1734) then duke-peer of Villeroy (1734–1766)
Gabriel-Louis de Neufville (1731–1794), duke-peer of Villeroy (1766–1790)

Bournonville
duchy-peerage in 1652, 1 holder 
Ambroise-François de Bournonville (1619–1693), duke-peer of Bournonville (1652–1693)

Cardone
duchy-peerage in 1652, 1 holder 
Philippe de La Mothe-Houdancourt (1605–1657), duke-peer of Cardone (1652–1653) then of Fayel

Créquy
duchy-peerage in 1652, 1 holder 
Charles de Bonne de Blanchefort (1623–1687), duke-peer of Créquy (1652–1687)

Orval
duchy-peerage in 1652, 1 holder 
François de Béthune (1599–1678), duke-peer of Orval (1652–1678)

Roquelaure
duchy-peerage in 1652, 2 holders 
Gaston de Roquelaure (1614–1683), duke-peer of Roquelaure (1652–1683)
Antoine Gaston de Roquelaure (1656–1738), duke-peer of Roquelaure (1683–1738)

Verneuil
duchy-peerage in 1652, 1 holder 
Henri de Bourbon (1601–1682), duke-peer of Verneuil (1652–1682)

Villars-Brancas
duchy-peerage in 1652, 5 holders 
Georges de Brancas (1568–1657), duke-peer of Villars-Brancas (1652–1657)
Louis-François de Brancas (+1679), duke-peer of Villars-Brancas (1657–1679)
Louis de Brancas (1663–1739), duke-peer of Villars-Brancas (1679–1709)
Louis-Antoine de Brancas (1682–1760), duke-peer of Villars-Brancas (1709–1731)
Louis de Brancas (1714–1794), peer with the courtesy title of duke of Lauraguais (1731–1760) then duke-peer of Villars-Brancas (1760–1790)

Fayel (Le Fayel) 
duchy-peerage in 1653, 1 holder 
Philippe de La Mothe-Houdancourt (1605–1657), duke-peer of Fayel (1653–1657)

La Guiche
duchy-peerage in 1653, 2 holders 
Louis-Emmanuel d'Angoulême (1596–1653), duke-peer of La Guiche (1653)
Louis de Lorraine (1622–1654), duke-peer of La Guiche (1653–1654) and of Joyeuse

Montaut
duchy-peerage in 1660, 1 holder 
Philippe de Montaut-Navailles (1619–1684), duke-peer of Montaut (1660–1684)

Randan
duchy-peerage in 1661, 3 holders 
Marie-Catherine de La Rochefoucauld (1588–1677), duchess-peeress of Randan (1661–1662)
Jean-Baptiste-Gaston de Foix (1638–1665), duke-peer of Randan (1662–1665)
Henri-François de Foix (1639–1714), duke-peer of Randan (1666–1714)

La Meilleraye
duchy-peerage in 1663, 4 holders 
Charles de La Porte (1602–1664), duke-peer of La Meilleraye (1663–1664)
Armand-Charles de La Porte (1632–1713), duke-peer of La Meilleraye (1664–1700) and of Rethel-Mazarin
Paul-Jules de La Porte-Mazarin (1666–1731), duke-peer of La Meilleraye (1700–1729) and of Rethel-Mazarin
Guy-Paul-Jules de La Porte-Mazarin (1701–1738), duke-peer of La Meillaraye (1729–1738) and of Rethel-Mazarin

Saint-Aignan
duchy-peerage in 1663, 7 holders 
François-Honorat de Beauvillier (1607–1687), duke-peer of Saint-Aignan (1663–1679)
Paul de Beauvillier (1648–1714), peer with the courtesy title of duke of Beauvillier (1679–1687) then duke-peer of Saint-Aignan (1679–1706)
Paul-Hippolyte de Beauvillier (1684–1776), duke-peer of Saint-Aignan (1706–1738)
Paul-François de Beauvillier (1710–1742), peer with the courtesy title of duke of Beauvillier (1738–1742)
Paul-Louis de Beauvillier (1711–1757), peer with the courtesy title of duke of Beauvillier (1742–1757)
Paul-Etienne de Beauvillier (1745–1771), peer with the courtesy title of duke of Beauvillier (1757–1771)
Paul de Beauvillier (1766–1794), peer with the courtesy title of duke of Beauvillier (1771–1776) then duke-peer of Saint-Aignan (1776–1790)

Noailles
duchy-peerage in 1663, 4 holders 
Anne de Noailles (1615–1678), duke-peer of Noailles (1663–1677)
Anne Jules de Noailles (1650–1708), peer with the courtesy title of duke of Ayen (1677–1678) then duke-peer of Noailles (1678–1704)
Adrien Maurice de Noailles (1678–1766), duke-peer of Noailles (1704–1766)
Louis de Noailles (1713–1793), duke-peer of Noailles (1766–1790)

Coislin
duchy-peerage in 1663, 3 holders 
Armand du Cambout (1635–1702), duke-peer of Coislin (1663–1702)
Pierre du Cambout (1663–1710), duke-peer of Coislin (1702–1710)
Henri-Charles du Cambout (1664–1732), duke-peer of Coislin (1710–1732)

Montausier
duchy-peerage in 1664, 1 holder 
Charles de Sainte-Maure (1610–1690), duke-peer of Montausier (1664–1690)

Choiseul
duchy-peerage in 1665, 5 holders 
César de Choiseul (1598–1675), duke-peer of Choiseul (1665–1675)
César-Auguste de Choiseul (1664–1684), duke-peer of Choiseul (1675–1684)
César-Auguste de Choiseul (1637–1705), duke-peer of Choiseul (1684–1705)
Étienne-François de Choiseul (1719–1785), duke-peer of Choiseul (1758–1785)
Claude-Gabriel de Choiseul (1760–1838), duke-peer of Choiseul (1787–1790)

Aumont
duchy-peerage in 1665, 6 holders 
Antoine d'Aumont de Rochebaron (1601–1669), duke-peer of Aumont (1665–1669)
Louis-Victor d'Aumont de Rochebaron (1632–1704), duke-peer of Aumont (1669–1704)
Louis d'Aumont de Rochebaron (1666–1723), duke-peer of Aumont (1704–1722)
Louis-Marie d'Aumont de Rochebaron (1691–1723), peer with the courtesy title of duke of Villequier (1722–1723) then duke-peer of Aumont (1723)
Louis-Augustin d'Aumont de Rochebaron (1709–1782), duke-peer of Aumont (1723–1782)
Louis-Guy d'Aumont de Rochebaron (1732–1799), duke-peer of Aumont (1782–1790)

La Ferté-Senneterre (Saint-Nectaire)
duchy-peerage in 1665, 2 holders 
Henri de Senneterre (v.1600-1681), duke-peer of La Ferté-Senneterre (1665–1678)
Henri-François de Senneterre (1657–1703), duke-peer of La Ferté-Senneterre (1678–1703)

La Vallière
duchy-peerage in 1667, 5 holders 
Louise-Françoise de La Baume Le Blanc (1644–1710), duchess-peeress of La Vallière (1667–1675)
Marie Anne de Bourbon (1666–1739), duchess-peeress of La Vallière (1675–1723)
Louis Armand I de Bourbon-Conti (1661–1685), duke-peer of La Vallière (1680–1685)
Charles-François de La Baume Le Blanc (1670–1739), duke-peer of La Vallière (1723–1732)
Louis César de La Baume Le Blanc (1708–1780), duke-peer of La Vallière (1732–1780)

Duras
duchy-peerage in 1668, 3 holders 
Jacques-Henri de Durfort (1625–1704), duke-peer of Duras (1668–1704)
Emmanuel-Félicité de Durfort (1715–1789), peer with the courtesy title of duke of Durfort (1755–1770) then duke-peer of Duras (1770–1789)
Emmanuel-Céleste de Durfort (1741–1800), duke-peer of Duras (1789–1790)

Chârost
duchy-peerage in 1672, 6 holders 
Louis de Béthune (1605–1681), duke-peer of Chârost (1672–1681)
Louis-Armand de Béthune (1641–1717), duke-peer of Chârost (1681–1695)
Armand de Béthune (1662–1747), duke-peer of Chârost (1695–1724)
Paul-François de Béthune (1682–1759), duke-peer of Chârost (1724–1737)
François-Joseph de Béthune (1719–1739), peer with the courtesy title of duke of Ancenis (1737–1739)
Armand-Joseph de Béthune (1738–1800), peer with the courtesy title of duke of Ancenis (1739–1759) then duke-peer of Chârost (1759–1790)

Saint-Cloud
duchy-peerage in 1674 for the Archbishop of Paris, 6 holders 
François de Harlay de Champvallon (1625–1695), duke-peer of Saint-Cloud (1674–1695), archbishop of Paris
Louis-Antoine de Noailles (1651–1729), duke-peer of Saint-Cloud (1695–1729), archbishop of Paris
Charles-Gaspard-Guillaume de Vintimille du Luc (1655–1746), duke-peer of Saint-Cloud (1729–1746), archbishop of Paris
Jacques Bonne-Gigault de Bellefonds (1698–1746), duke-peer of Saint-Cloud (1746), archbishop of Paris
Christophe de Beaumont du Repaire (1703–1781), duke-peer of Saint-Cloud (1746–1781), archbishop of Paris
Antoine-Eléonore-Léon Le Clerc de Juigné (1728–1811), duke-peer of Saint-Cloud (1781–1790), archbishop of Paris

Le Lude
duchy-peerage in 1675, 1 holder 
Henry de Daillon (1623–1685), duke-peer of Le Lude (1675–1685)

Aubigny
duchy-peerage in 1684, 3 holders 
Charles Lennox, 1st Duke of Richmond (1672–1723), duke-peer of Aubigny (1684–1723)
Louise-Renée de Penancoët de Kéroualle (1649–1734), duchess-peeress of Aubigny (1684–1734)
Charles Lennox, 3rd Duke of Richmond (1734–1806), duke-peer of Aubigny (1777–1790)

18th century

Châteauvillain
duchy-peerage in 1703, 2 holders 
Louis-Alexandre de Bourbon (1678–1737), duke-peer of Châteauvilllain (1703–1737) and of Penthièvre
Louis-Jean-Marie de Bourbon (1725–1793), duke-peer of Châteauvillain (1737–1790) and of Penthièvre

Boufflers
duchy-peerage in 1708, 3 holders 
Louis-Francois de Boufflers (1644–1711), duke-peer of Boufflers (1708–1711)
Joseph-Marie de Boufflers (1706–1747), duke-peer of Boufflers (1711–1747)
Charles-Joseph de Boufflers (1731–1751), duke-peer of Boufflers (1747–1751)

Villars
duchy-peerage in 1709, 2 holders 
Claude Louis Hector de Villars (1653–1734), duke-peer of Villars (1709–1734)
Honoré Armand de Villars (1702–1770), duke-peer of Villars (1734–1770)

Harcourt
duchy-peerage in 1709, 5 holders 
Henri d'Harcourt (1654–1718), duke-peer of Harcourt (1709–1718)
François d'Harcourt (1689–1750), duke-peer of Harcourt (1718–1750)
Louis-Abraham d'Harcourt (1694–1750), duke-peer of Harcourt (1750)
Anne Pierre d'Harcourt (1701–1783), duke-peer of Harcourt (1750–1783)
François-Henri d'Harcourt (1726–1802), duke-peer of Harcourt (1783–1790)

Fitz-James
duchy-peerage in 1710, 5 holders 
James Stuart-Fitz-James (1670–1734), duke-peer of Fitz-James (1710–1720 and 1721–1734)
James Fitz-James (1702–1721), duke-peer of Fitz-James (1720–1721)
Francis Fitz-James (1709–1764), duke-peer of Fitz-James (1734–1736)
Charles Fitz-James (1712–1787), duke-peer of Fitz-James (1736–1769)
James Fitz-James (1743–1805), duke-peer of Fitz-James (1769–1790)

Antin
duchy-peerage in 1711, 3 holders 
Louis-Antoine de Pardaillan (1707–1743), duke-peer of Antin (1711–1722)
Louis de Pardaillan (1707–1743), peer with the courtesy title of duke of Epernon (1722–1743) then duke-peer of Antin (1743)
Louis de Pardaillan (1727–1757), duke-peer of Antin (1743–1757)

Rambouillet
duchy-peerage in 1711, 2 holders 
Louis-Alexandre de Bourbon (1678–1737), duke-peer of Rambouillet (1711–1737) and of Penthièvre
Louis-Jean-Marie de Bourbon (1725–1793), duke-peer of Rambouillet (1737–1783) and of Penthièvre

Rohan-Rohan
duchy-peerage in 1714, 2 holders 
Hercule-Mériadec de Rohan-Soubise (1669–1749), duke-peer of Rohan-Rohan (1714–1749)
Charles de Rohan-Soubise (1715–1787), duke-peer of Rohan-Rohan (1749–1787)

Hostun
duchy-peerage in 1715, 2 holders 
Marie-Joseph d'Hostun (1684–1755), duke-peer of Hostun (1715–1732 and 1739–1755)
Louis-Charles d'Hostun (1716–1739), duke-peer of Hostun (1732–1739)

Lévis
duchy-peerage in 1723, 1 holder 
Charles-Eugène de Lévis-Charlus (1669–1734), duke-peer of Lévis (1723–1734)

Châtillon
duchy-peerage in 1736, 2 holders 
Alexis de Châtillon (1690–1754), duke-peer of Châtillon (1736–1754)
Louis-Gaucher de Châtillon (1737–1762), duke-peer of Châtillon (1754–1762)

Fleury
duchy-peerage in 1736, 3 holders 
Jean-Hercule de Rosset (1683–1748), duke-peer of Fleury (1736)
André-Hercule de Rosset (1715–1788), duke-peer of Fleury (1736–1788)
André-Hercule de Rosset (1767–1810), duke-peer of Fleury (1788–1790)

Gisors
duchy-peerage in 1748, 2 holders 
Charles-Louis Fouquet de Belle-Isle (1684–1761), duke-peer of Gisors (1748–1761)
Louis-Jean-Marie de Bourbon (1725–1793), duke-peer of Gisors (1776–1790)

Taillebourg
duchy-peerage in 1749, 1 holder 
Louis-Stanislas de La Trémoïlle (1734–1749), duke-peer of Taillebourg (1749)

Mid-18th century
La Vauguyon
duchy-peerage in 1758, 2 holders 
Antoine de Quélen de Stuer de Caussade (1706–1772), duke-peer of La Vauguyon (1758–1772)
Paul-François de Quélen de Stuer de Caussade (1746–1828), duke-peer of La Vauguyon (1772–1790)

Praslin
duchy-peerage in 1762, 2 holders 
César-Gabriel de Choiseul-Praslin (1712–1785), duke-peer of Praslin (1762–1785)
Renaud César de Choiseul-Praslin (1735–1791), duke-peer of Praslin (1785–1790)

Brunoy
duchy-peerage in 1777, 2 holders 
Louis of France (1755–1824), duke-peer of Brunoy (1777–1790) and of Anjou then king (Louis XVIII) of France
Marie-Josèphe of Savoy (1753–1810), duchess-peeress of Brunoy (1777–1790)

Louvois
duchy-peerage in 1777, 2 holders 
Sophie of France (1734–1782), duchess-peeress of Louvois (1777–1782)
Marie-Adélaïde of France (1732–1800), duchess-peeress of Louvois (1732–1800)

Amboise
duchy-peerage in 1787, 1 holder 
Louis-Jean-Marie de Bourbon (1725–1793), duke-peer of Amboise (1787–1790) and of Penthièvre

Coigny
duchy-peerage in 1787, 1 holder 
François-Henri de Franquetot de Coigny (1737–1821), duke-peer of Coigny (1787–1790)

Peers by birth
A type of personal peerage, instituted in 1576 for the princes of the blood of France. This practically ensures that any adult prince of the blood is a peer of France. At the age of 15, they are allowed to sit among the other Peers of the Realm. The royal princes who actually sat in respect of this type of peerage, having reached their 15th year, were as follows, at the dates indicated:
1576-1582 prince Louis II de Bourbon-Montpensier (1513–1582), also duke-peer of Montpensier
1576-1584 prince Francis of France (1554–1584), also duke-peer of Anjou and of Alençon
1576-1588 prince Henri I de Bourbon-Condé (1552–1588), prince of Condé
1576-1589 prince Henri de Bourbon (1553–1610), also duke-peer of Vendôme, (King Henry III) of Navarre, king (Henry IV) of France
1576-1590 prince, cardinal Charles de Bourbon (1523–1590), also duke-peer of Graville
1576-1592 prince François de Bourbon-Montpensier (1542–1592), also duke-peer of Montpensier
1576-1614 prince François de Bourbon-Conti (1558–1614), prince of Conti
1577-1594 prince, cardinal Charles de Bourbon-Condé (1562–1594)
1581-1612 prince Charles de Bourbon (1566–1612), also count-peer of Soissons
1588-1608 prince Henri de Bourbon-Montpensier (1573–1608), also duke-peer of Montpensier
1603-1646 prince Henri II de Bourbon-Condé (1588–1646), prince of Condé, also duke-peer of Montmorency and of Albret
1619-1641 prince Louis de Bourbon (1604–1641), also count-peer of Soissons
1623-1660 prince Gaston d'Orléans (1608–1660), also duke-peer of Orléans
1636-1686 prince Louis II de Bourbon-Condé (1621–1686), prince of Condé, also duke of Bourbon and of Albret
1644-1666 prince Armand de Bourbon-Conti (1629–1666), prince of Conti
1655-1701 prince Philip II d'Orléans (1640–1701), also duke-peer of Orléans
1658-1709 prince Henri-Jules de Bourbon-Condé (1643–1709), prince of Condé, also duke-peer of Guise and of Montmorency
1676-1685 prince Louis-Armand I de Bourbon-Conti (1661–1685), prince of Conti, also duke-peer of La Vallière
1676-1711 prince Louis of France (1661–1711), dauphin of France
1679-1709 prince François-Louis de Bourbon-Conti (1664–1709), prince of Conti
1683-1710 prince Louis III de Bourbon-Condé (1668–1710), prince of Condé, also duke-peer of Bourbon and of Guise
1689-1723 prince Philip III d'Orléans (1674–1723), also duke-peer of Orléans
1697-1712 prince Louis of France (1682–1712), duke of Burgundy then dauphin of France
1698-1700 prince Philippe d'Anjou (1683–1746), duke of Anjou then king (Philip V) of Spain
1701-1714 prince Charles de Berry (1686–1714), duke of Berry, also duke-peer of Angoulême and of Alençon
1707-1740 prince Louis-Henri de Bourbon-Condé (1692–1740), prince of Condé, also duke-peer of Bourbon and of Guise
1711-1727 prince Louis-Armand II de Bourbon-Conti (1696–1727), prince of Conti, also duke-peer of Mercœur
1715-1760 prince Charles de Bourbon-Condé (1700–1760), count of Charolais
1718-1752 prince Louis III d'Orléans (1703–1752), also duke-peer of Orléans
1724-1771 prince Louis de Bourbon-Condé (1709–1771), count of Clermont
1732-1776 prince Louis-François I de Bourbon-Conti (1717–1776), prince of Conti, also duke-peer of Mercœur
1740-1785 prince Louis-Philip I d'Orléans (1725–1785), also duke-peer of Orléans
1744-1765 prince Louis of France (1729–1765), dauphin of France
1749-1790 prince Louis-François II de Bourbon-Conti (1734–1814), prince of Conti
1751-1790 prince Louis-Joseph de Bourbon-Condé (1736–1818), prince of Condé, also duke-peer of Bourbon and of Guise
1762-1790 prince Louis-Philippe-Joseph d'Orléans (1747–1793), also duke-peer of Orléans
1769-1774 prince Louis of France (1754–1793), duke of Berry then dauphin of France then king (Louis XVI) of France
1770-1790 prince Louis of France (1755–1824), count of Provence, also duke-peer of Anjou and of Alençon then king (Louis XVIII) of France
1771-1790 prince Louis-Henri-Joseph de Bourbon-Condé (1756–1830), duke of Bourbon, prince of Condé in 1818
1772-1790 prince Charles of France (1757–1836), count of Artois, also duke-peer of Angoulême and of Berry then king (Charles X) of France
1787-1790 prince Louis-Antoine-Henri de Bourbon-Condé (1772–1804), duke of Enghien
1788-1790 prince Louis-Philippe II d'Orléans (1773–1850), duke of Chartres, duke of Orléans in 1793 then king (Louis-Philippe I) of the French

See also
 Peerage of France
 List of French peerages
 List of coats of arms of French peers

Bibliography
Christophe Levantal, Ducs et pairs et duchés-pairies laïques à l'époque moderne (1519-1790), Paris, 1996

France
 
French peers
 

fr:Pairie de France (Ancien Régime)